From July 1, 2016 to April 23, 2017, the following skiing events took place at various locations around the world.

Alpine skiing

World Championships (Alpine)
 January 22–31 2017 World Para Alpine Skiing Championships in  Tarvisio
 For results, click here.
 February 6–19: FIS Alpine World Ski Championships 2017 in  St. Moritz
  and  won 3 gold medals each. Austria won the overall medal tally.
 March 6–14: 2017 World Junior Alpine Skiing Championships in  Åre
  and  won 3 gold medals each. Austria won the overall medal tally.

2017 Alpine Skiing World Cup
 October 22, 2016 – March 19, 2017: FIS 2016–17 Alpine Skiing World Cup

October
 October 22 & 23: ASWC #1 in  Sölden
 Giant Slalom winners:  Alexis Pinturault (m) /  Lara Gut (f)
November
 November 12 & 13: ASWC #2 in  Levi
 Slalom winners:  Marcel Hirscher (m) /  Mikaela Shiffrin (f)
 November 23–27: ASWC #3 in  Lake Louise #1
 All events cancelled, due to unfavorable weather conditions.
 November 26 & 27: ASWC #4 in  Killington
 Women's Giant Slalom winner:  Tessa Worley
 Women's Slalom winner:  Mikaela Shiffrin
 November 29 – December 4: ASWC #5 in  Val-d'Isère #1
 Note: This event was supposed to be held at Beaver Creek Resort, but it was cancelled, due to unfavorable weather conditions.
 Men's Super G winner:  Kjetil Jansrud
 Men's Downhill winner:  Kjetil Jansrud
 Men's Giant Slalom winner:  Mathieu Faivre
 November 29 – December 4: ASWC #6 in  Lake Louise #2
 Women's Downhill winner:  Ilka Štuhec (2 times)
 Women's Super G winner:  Lara Gut
December
 December 10 & 11: ASWC #7 in  Val-d'Isère #2
 Men's Giant Slalom winner:  Alexis Pinturault
 Men's Slalom winner:  Henrik Kristoffersen
 December 10 & 11: ASWC #8 in  Sestriere
 Women's Giant Slalom winner:  Tessa Worley
 Women's Slalom winner:  Mikaela Shiffrin
 December 14–17: ASWC #9 in  Val Gardena
 Men's Super G winner:  Kjetil Jansrud
 Men's Downhill winner:  Max Franz
 December 14–18: ASWC #10 in  Val-d'Isère #3
 Women's Alpine Combined winner:  Ilka Štuhec
 Women's Downhill winner:  Ilka Štuhec
 Women's Super G winner:  Lara Gut
 December 18 & 19: ASWC #11 in  Alta Badia
 Men's Giant Slalom winner:  Marcel Hirscher
 Men's Parallel Giant Slalom winner:  Cyprien Sarrazin
 December 20: ASWC #12 in  Courchevel
 Event cancelled, due to strong winds.
 December 22: ASWC #13 in  Madonna di Campiglio
 Men's Slalom winner:  Henrik Kristoffersen
 December 26–29: ASWC #14 in  Santa Caterina
 The Men's Downhill event here was cancelled.
 Men's Super G winner:  Kjetil Jansrud
 Men's Alpine Combined winner:  Alexis Pinturault
 December 27–29: ASWC #15 in  Semmering
 Note: One Giant Slalom event was rescheduled from the Courchevel venue to this one.
 Women's Giant Slalom winner:  Mikaela Shiffrin (2 times)
 Women's Slalom winner:  Mikaela Shiffrin
January
 January 3 & 5: ASWC #15 in  Zagreb
 Slalom winners:  Manfred Mölgg (m) /  Veronika Velez-Zuzulová (f)
 January 7 & 8: ASWC #16 in  Adelboden
 Men's Giant Slalom winner:  Alexis Pinturault
 Men's Slalom winner:  Henrik Kristoffersen
 January 7 & 8: WC #17 in  Maribor
 Women's Giant Slalom winner:  Tessa Worley
 Women's Slalom winner:  Mikaela Shiffrin
 January 10: ASWC #18 in  Flachau
 Women's Slalom winner:  Frida Hansdotter
 January 10–15: ASWC #19 in  Wengen
 Note: The men's downhill event here was cancelled.
 Men's Alpine Combined winner:  Niels Hintermann
 Men's Slalom winner:  Henrik Kristoffersen
 January 12–15: ASWC #20 in  Altenmarkt im Pongau
 Note: The women's alpine combined event here was cancelled.
 Women's Downhill winner:  Christine Scheyer
 January 17–22: ASWC #21 in  Kitzbühel
 Men's Super G winner:  Matthias Mayer
 Men's Downhill winner:  Dominik Paris
 Men's Slalom winner:  Marcel Hirscher
 January 19–22: ASWC #22 in  Garmisch-Partenkirchen #1
 Women's Downhill winner:  Lindsey Vonn
 Women's Super G winner:  Lara Gut
 January 24: ASWC #23 in  Schladming
 Men's Slalom winner:  Henrik Kristoffersen
 January 24: ASWC #24 in  Kronplatz
 Women's Giant Slalom winner:  Federica Brignone
 January 26–29: ASWC #25 in  Garmisch-Partenkirchen #2
 Men's Downhill winners:  Travis Ganong (#1) /  Hannes Reichelt (#2)
 Men's Giant Slalom winner:  Marcel Hirscher
 January 26–29: ASWC #26 in  Cortina d'Ampezzo
 Women's Downhill winner:  Lara Gut
 Women's Super G winner:  Ilka Štuhec
 January 31: ASWC #27 in  Stockholm
 City Event winners:  Linus Straßer (m) /  Mikaela Shiffrin (f)
February
 February 23–26: ASWC #28 in  Kvitfjell
 Men's Downhill winners:  Boštjan Kline (#1) /  Kjetil Jansrud (#2)
 Men's Super G winner:  Peter Fill
 February 24–26: ASWC #29 in  Crans-Montana
 Women's Alpine Combined winners:  Federica Brignone (#1) /  Mikaela Shiffrin (#2)
 Women's Super G winner:  Ilka Štuhec
March
 March 2–5: ASWC #30 in  Jeongseon
 Women's Downhill & Super G winner:  Sofia Goggia
 March 4 & 5: ASWC #31 in  Kranjska Gora
 Men's Giant Slalom winner:  Marcel Hirscher
 Men's Slalom winner:  Michael Matt
 March 10 & 11: ASWC #32 in  Squaw Valley
 Women's Giant Slalom and Slalom winner:  Mikaela Shiffrin
 March 13–19: ASWC #33 (final) in  Aspen
 Downhill winners:  Dominik Paris (m) /  Ilka Štuhec (f)
 Super G winners:  Hannes Reichelt (m) /  Tina Weirather (f)
 Giant Slalom winners:  Marcel Hirscher (m) /  Federica Brignone (f)
 Slalom winners:  André Myhrer (m) /  Petra Vlhová (f)
 Alpine Team Event winners:  (Frida Hansdotter, Maria Pietilä Holmner, Emelie Wikstroem, Mattias Hargin, André Myhrer, & Matts Olsson)

November 29 & 30: ASEC #1 in  Levi
 Men's Slalom winners:  Leif Kristian Haugen (#1);  Marc Digruber (#2)
 December 3 & 4: ASEC #2 in  Gällivare
 Men's Giant Slalom winners:  Cyprien Sarrazin (m) / Second event is cancelled
 December 4–6: ASEC #3 in  Trysil
 Women's Giant Slalom winner:  Kristin Anna Lysdahl
 Women's Slalom winners:  Maren Skjøld (#1);  Maren Wiesler (#2)
 December 8–10: ASEC #4 in  Kvitfjell
 Women's Giant Slalom winner:  Clara Direz
 Women's Super G winner:  Dajana Dengscherz
 Women's Alpine combined winner:  Kristina Riis-Johannessen
 December 8–11: ASEC #5 in  Hafjell
 Unfortunately the races in Hafjell are cancelled.
 December 14: ASEC #6 in  Obereggen
 Men's Slalom winner:  Loïc Meillard
 December 15: ASEC #7 in  Val di Fassa
 Men's Slalom winner:  Daniel Yule
 December 15 & 16: ASEC #8 in  Andalo
 Women's Giant Slalom winner:  Simone Wild
 Women's Slalom winner:  Resi Stiegler
 December 17: ASEC #8 in  Kronplatz
 Parallel Slalom winners:  Reto Schmidiger (m) /  Katharina Gallhuber (f)
 Slalom winners (1 run):  Matej Vidović (m) /  Resi Stiegler (f)
 December 20 & 21: ASEC #9 in  Schladming
 Men's Super G winners:  Bjørnar Neteland (#1) /  Christoph Krenn (#2)
 January 6 & 7, 2017: ASEC #10 in  Wengen
 Men's Super G winners:  Mattia Casse (2 times)
 January 9–13: ASEC #11 in  Saalbach-Hinterglemm
 Women's Downhill winners:  Christina Ager (#1) / (#2)
 Women's Super G here is cancelled
 January 9 & 10: ASEC #12 in  Davos #1
 Men's Giant Slalom winners:  Marcus Monsen (#1) /  Samu Torsti (#2)
 January 11 & 12: ASEC #13 in  Zell am See
 Men's Slalom winners:  Matej Vidović (#1) /  Thomas Hettegger (#2)
 January 14–16: ASEC #14 in  Kitzbühel
 Men's Downhill winner:  Gilles Roulin
 January 16 & 17: ASEC #15 in  Zinal
 Women's Giant Slalom winners:  Kristina Riis-Johannessen (#1) /  Jessica Hilzinger (#2)
 January 19 & 20: ASEC #16 in  Melchsee-Frutt
 Women's Slalom winners:  Marina Wallner (#1) /  Jessica Hilzinger (#2)
 January 19 & 20: ASEC #17 in  Val-d'Isère
 Men's Giant Slalom winners:  Cyprien Sarrazin (#1) /  Gino Caviezel (#2)
 January 23–27: ASEC #18 in  Davos #2
 Women's Downhill winners:  Kristina Riis-Johannessen (#1) /  Sabrina Maier (#2)
 Women's Super-G winners:  Stephanie Brunner (#1) /  Nadine Fest (#2)
 January 23–27: ASEC #19 in  Méribel
 Men's Downhill winners:  Johannes Kröll (#1) /  Gilles Roulin (#2)
 Men's Super-G winner:  Gilles Roulin
 Men's Alpine Combined winner:  Marcus Monsen
 January 31 – February 3: ASEC #20 in  Châtel
 Women's Super-G winners:  Nadine Fest (#1) /  Kristina Riis-Johannessen (#2)
 Women's Giant Slalom winners:  Kristin Anna Lysdahl (#1) /  Tina Robnik (#2)
 Women's Alpine Combined winner:  Nadine Fest
 January 31 – February 3: ASEC #21 in  Hinterstoder
 Men's Downhill winners:  Gilles Roulin (2 times)
 Men's Super-G winner:  Gilles Roulin
 Men's Alpine Combined:  Gilles Roulin
 February 8 & 9: ASEC #22 in  Jasná
 Men's Giant Slalom winners:  Rasmus Windingstad (#1) /  Elia Zurbriggen (#2)
 February 9 & 10: ASEC #23 in  Bad Wiessee
 Women's Slalom winners:  Mélanie Meillard (2 times)
 February 11 & 12: ASEC #24 in  Zakopane
 Men's Slalom winners:  Reto Schmidiger (#1) /  Marc Digruber (#2)
 February 13 & 14: ASEC #25 in  Göstling-Hochkar
 Women's Giant Slalom winner:  Tina Robnik
 Women's Slalom winner:  Anna Swenn-Larsson
 February 17–20: ASEC #26 in  Crans-Montana
 Women's Downhill winners:  Laura Pirovano (#1) /  Sabrina Maier (#2)
 Women's Alpine combined winner:  Rosina Schneeberger
 February 17 & 18: ASEC #27 in  Oberjoch
 Men's Giant Slalom winners:  Elia Zurbriggen (#1) /  Cyprien Sarrazin (#2)
 Men's Slalom winner:  Marc Digruber
 February 20–25: ASEC #28 in  Sarntal
 Super G winners:  Christian Walder (m) /  Nina Ortlieb (f)
 Men's Alpine combined winner:  Sandro Simonet
 Men's Downhill winners:  Joachim Puchner (#1) /  Johannes Kröll (#2)
 Women's Downhill winner:  Lisa Hörnblad
 March 17–19: ASEC #29 in  San Candido (final)
 Giant Slalom winners:  Elia Zurbriggen (m) /  Elisabeth Kappaurer (f)
 Slalom winners:  Ramon Zenhäusern (m) /   Camille Rast (f)

2016–17 North America Cup
 November 29 & 30, 2016: ASNAC #1 in  Snow King Mountain/Jackson, Wyoming
 Due to the lack of snow, the Snow King Race to the Cup has been canceled.
 December 5–9, 2016: ASNAC #2 in  Lake Louise
 Downhill #1 winners:  Nicholas Krause (m) /  Stefanie Fleckenstein (f)
 Downhill #2 winners:  Tyler Werry (m) /  Georgia Willinger (f)
 December 11–18, 2016: ASNAC #3 in  Panorama Mountain Village
 Super G #1 winners:  Joan Verdu Sanchez (m) /  Maureen Lebel (f)
 Super G #2 winners:  Joan Verdu Sanchez (m) /  Alice Merryweather (f)
 Alpine combined winners:  Kieffer Christianson (m) /  Patricia Mangan (f)
 Giant Slalom #1 winners:  Phil Brown (m) /  Erin Mielzynski (f)
 Giant Slalom #2 winners:  Phil Brown (m) /  Amelia Smart (f)
 Slalom #1 winners:  Hig Roberts (m) /  Erin Mielzynski (f)
 Slalom #2 winners:  David Ketterer (m) /  Erin Mielzynski (f)
 January 2–5: ASNAC #4 in  Burke Mountain Ski Area
 Giant Slalom winners:  Paula Moltzan (#1) /  Ali Nullmeyer (#2)
 Slalom winners:  Paula Moltzan (#1) /  Ali Nullmeyer (#2)
 January 2–5: ASNAC #5 in  Stowe Mountain Resort
 Giant Slalom winners:  Nicholas Krause (#1) /  Hig Roberts (#2)
 Slalom winners:  David Ketterer (#1) /  Jett Seymour (#2)
 February 1–4: ASNAC #6 in  Vail Ski Resort
 Men's Slalom winners:  David Ketterer (#1) /  Mark Engel (#2)
 Women's Slalom winners:  Ali Nullmeyer (2 times)
 February 1–11: ASNAC #7 in  Copper Mountain
 Men's Giant Slalom winners:  Erik Read (#1) /  Trevor Philp (#2)
 Women's Giant Slalom winners:  Megan McJames (#1) /  Ali Nullmeyer (#2)
 Men's Downhill winners:  Broderick Thompson (#1) /  Tyler Werry (#2)
 Women's Downhill winners:  Alice McKennis (2 times)
 Super G #1 winners:  Nicholas Krause (m) /  Patricia Mangan (f)
 Super G #2 winners:  Nicholas Krause (m) /  Patricia Mangan (f)
 Alpine combined winners:  Tyler Werry (m) /  Nina O'Brien (f)
 March 17–20: ASNAC #8 in  Mont Ste. Marie
 Men's Giant Slalom winners:  Tim Jitloff (#1) /  Trevor Philp (#2)
 Men's Slalom winner:  David Ketterer (2 times)
 March 17 & 18: ASNAC #9 in  Val Saint-Côme Ski Resort
 Women's Slalom winners:  Laurie Mougel (#1) /  Ali Nullmeyer (#2)
 March 19 & 20: ASNAC #10 in  Garceau
 Women's Giant Slalom winners:  Nina O'Brien (#1) /  Mikaela Tommy (#2)
 March 22 & 23: ASNAC #11 (final) in  Sugarloaf
 Alpine combined winners:  Sam Mulligan (m) /  Mikaela Tommy (f)
 Super G #1 winners:  Erik Arvidsson (m) /  Stacey Cook (f)
 Super G #2 winners:  Kipling Weisel (m) /  Megan McJames (f)

2016–17 Far East Cup
 December 11–14: FEC #1 in  Wanlong Ski Resort/Zhangjiakou
 Men's Slalom winners:  Simon Efimov (#1) /  Ryunosuke Ohkoshi (#2)
 Women's Slalom winners:  Rinata Abdulkaiumova (#1) /  Sakurako Mukogawa (#2)
 Men's Giant Slalom winners:  Ian Gut (2 times) 
 Women's giant Slalom winners:  Mio Arai (2 times)
 January 16–19: FEC #2 in  Yongpyong Resort
 Men's Slalom winners:  Ryunosuke Ohkoshi (#1) /  Žan Kranjec (#2)
 Women's Slalom winners:  Emi Hasegawa (#1) /  Nevena Ignjatović (#2) 
 Men's Giant Slalom winners:  Žan Kranjec (#1) /  Pavel Trikhichev (#2)
 Women's Giant Slalom winners:  Alexandra Tilley (#1) /  Asa Andō (#2)
 January 22–24: FEC #3 in  Alpensia Resort
 Slalom #1 winners:  Pavel Trikhichev (m) /  Nevena Ignjatović (f)
 Slalom #2 winners:  Pavel Trikhichev (m) /  Ekaterina Tkachenko (f)
 Slalom #3 winners:  Žan Grošelj (m) /  Ekaterina Tkachenko (f)
 March 3–5: FEC #4 in  Sapporo Teine
 Note: One Giant Slalom event here was cancelled.
 Giant Slalom winners:  Marco Reymond (m) /  Asa Andō (f)
 Slalom winners:  Sebastian Holzmann (m) /  Ylva Stålnacke (f)
 March 8–10: FEC #5 in  Engaru, Hokkaido
 Giant Slalom winners:  Alexander Schmid (m) /  Asa Andō (f)
 Slalom #1 winners:  Sebastian Holzmann (m) /  Ylva Stålnacke (f)
 Slalom #2 winners:  Sebastian Holzmann (m) /  Ylva Stålnacke (f)
 March 17–22: FEC #6 in  Yuzhno-Sakhalinsk
 Super G #1 winners:  Riccardo Tonetti (m) /  Aleksandra Prokopyeva (f)
 Super G #2 winners:  Štefan Hadalin (m) /  Aleksandra Prokopyeva (f)
 Giant Slalom #1 winners:  Pavel Trikhichev (m) /  Emi Hasegawa (f)
 Giant Slalom #2 winners:  Roberto Nani (m) /  Emi Hasegawa (f)
 Slalom #1 winners:  Jung Dong-hyun (m) /  Maruša Ferk (f)
 Slalom #2 winners:  Pavel Trikhichev (m) /  Emi Hasegawa (f)
 March 30 & 31: FEC #7 (final) in  Ontake
 Alpine combined winners:  Yumenosuke Kakizaki (m) /  Sakurako Mukogawa (f)
 Super G #1 winners:  Yumenosuke Kakizaki (m) /  Sakurako Mukogawa (f)
 Super G #2 winners:  Dai Shimizu (m) /  Sakurako Mukogawa (f)

2016 FIS Alpine South American Cup
 August 4–5: SAC #1 in  Chapelco Ski Resort
 This event was cancelled due warm temperatures.
 August 8–11: SAC #2 in  Cerro Catedral
 Giant Slalom winners:  Pietro Franceschetti (m) /  María Belén Simari Birkner (f)
 Events in slalom was cancelled.
 August 13–15: SAC #3 in  Antillanca ski resort
 Slalom winners:  Sebastiano Gastaldi (m) /  Martina Dubovská (f)
 August 24–26: SAC #4 in  Valle Nevado
 Super G winners:  Klemen Kosi (m) /  Noelle Barahona (f)
 August 27: SAC #5 in  El Colorado #1
 Giant Slalom winners:  Štefan Hadalin (m) /  Jade Grillet-Aubert (f)
 August 28: SAC #6 in  La Parva #1
 Slalom winners:  Salomé Báncora (m) /  Francesca Baruzzi Farriol (f)
 August 31 – September 2: SAC #7 in  Las Leñas
 Cancelled
 September 5–9: SAC #8 in  La Parva #2
 Downhill #1 winners:  Brice Roger (m) /  Noelle Barahona (f)
 Downhill #2 winners:  Brice Roger (m) /  Ester Ledecká (f)
 Super G winners:  Valentin Giraud Moine (m) /  Ester Ledecká (f)
 September 12–16: SAC #9 in  El Colorado #2
 Alpine combined #1 winners:  Martin Cater (m) /  Ester Ledecká (f)
 Alpine combined #2 winners:  Thomas Dreßen (m) /  Ester Ledecká (f)
 Super G #1 winners:  Josef Ferstl (m) /  Ester Ledecká (f)
 Super G #2 winners:  Josef Ferstl (m) /  Ester Ledecká (f)
 Downhill #1 winners:  Josef Ferstl (m) /  Ester Ledecká (f)
 Downhill #1 winners:  Mattia Casse (m) /  Ester Ledecká (f)
 September 26–29: SAC #10 (final) in  Cerro Castor
 Giant Slalom winners:  Cyprien Sarrazin (m) /  Adeline Baud (f)
 Slalom winners:  Sebastiano Gastaldi (m) /  Adeline Baud (f)

2016 FIS Alpine Australia/New Zealand Cup
 August 22–26: ANC #1 in  Mount Hotham
 Giant Slalom #1 winners:  Willis Feasey (m) /  Julia Mutschlechner (f)
 Giant Slalom #2 winners:  Andreas Žampa (m) /  Julia Mutschlechner (f)
 Slalom #1 winners:  Robby Kelley (m) /  Rikke Gasmann-Brott (f)
 Slalom #2 winners:  Robby Kelley (m) /  Rikke Gasmann-Brott (f)
 August 29 – September 1: ANC #2 in  Coronet Peak
 Giant slalom #1 winners:  Tim Jitloff (m) /  Ragnhild Mowinckel (f)
 Giant Slalom #2 winners:  Manuel Feller (m) /  Bernadette Schild (f)
 Slalom #1 winners:  Manuel Feller (m) /  Ricarda Haaser (f)
 Slalom #2 winners:  Ramon Zenhäusern (m) /  Katharina Huber (f)
 September 6 & 7: ANC #3 (final) in  Mount Hutt
 Super G #1 winners:  Willis Feasey (m) /  Piera Hudson (f)
 Super G #2 winners:  Marc Gehrig (m) /  Piera Hudson (f)
 Alpine combined and Super G #3 here was cancelled

Biathlon
 November 25, 2016 – March 19, 2017: 2016–17 IBU Calendar of Events

International biathlon championships
 January 22–29: 2017 IBU Open European Championships in  Duszniki-Zdrój
 Individual winners:  Alexandr Loginov (m) /  Irina Starykh (f)
 Pursuit winners:  Alexandr Loginov (m) /  Irina Starykh (f)
 Sprint winners:  Vladimir Iliev (m) /  Juliya Dzhyma (f)
 Single Mixed Relay winners:  (Daria Virolaynen & Evgeniy Garanichev)
 Mixed Relay winners:  (Irina Starykh, Svetlana Sleptsova, Alexey Volkov & Alexandr Loginov)
 February 1–5: 2017 IBU Junior Open European Championships in  Nové Město na Moravě
 Junior Individual winners:  Igor Malinovskii (m) /  Anna Weidel (f)
 Junior Pursuit winners:  Milan Zemlicka (m) /  Marketa Davidova (f)
 Junior Sprint winners:  Nikita Porshnev (m) /  Marketa Davidova (f)
 February 6–19: Biathlon World Championships 2017 in  Hochfilzen
 Individual winners:  Lowell Bailey (m) /  Laura Dahlmeier (f)
 Pursuit winners:  Martin Fourcade (m) /  Laura Dahlmeier (f)
 Sprint winners:  Benedikt Doll (m) /  Gabriela Koukalová (f)
 Men's Relay winners:  (Alexey Volkov, Maxim Tsvetkov, Anton Babikov, & Anton Shipulin)
 Women's Relay winners:  (Vanessa Hinz, Maren Hammerschmidt, Franziska Hildebrand, & Laura Dahlmeier)
 Mixed Relay winners:  (Vanessa Hinz, Laura Dahlmeier, Arnd Peiffer & Simon Schempp)
 Mass Start winners:  Simon Schempp (m) /  Laura Dahlmeier (f)
 February 22–28: 2017 IBU Youth/Junior World Championships in  Brezno-Osrblie
 Note: This event was supposed to be hosted in Ostrov, but the IBU took it back.
  won both the gold and overall medal tallies.
 August 24–27: 2017 IBU Summer Biathlon World Championships in  Chaykovsky, Perm Krai
  won both the gold and overall medal tallies.

2016–17 Biathlon World Cup
 November 25 – December 4, 2016: BWC #1 in  Östersund
 Individual winners:  Martin Fourcade (m) /  Laura Dahlmeier (f)
 Pursuit winners:  Anton Babikov (m) /  Gabriela Koukalová (f)
 Sprint winners:  Martin Fourcade (m) /  Marie Dorin Habert (f)
 Single Mixed Relay winners:  (Martin Fourcade, Marie Dorin Habert)
 Mixed 2x6 + 2x7.5 km Relay winners:  (Johannes Thingnes Bø, Ole Einar Bjørndalen, Fanny Horn Birkeland, Marte Olsbu)
 December 5–11, 2016: BWC #2 in  Pokljuka
 Pursuit winners:  Martin Fourcade (m) /  Laura Dahlmeier (f)
 Sprint winners:  Martin Fourcade (m) /  Laura Dahlmeier (f)
 Men's Relay winners:  (Jean-Guillaume Béatrix, Quentin Fillon Maillet, Simon Desthieux, Martin Fourcade)
 Women's Relay winners:  (Vanessa Hinz, Franziska Hildebrand, Maren Hammerschmidt, Laura Dahlmeier)
 December 12–18, 2016: BWC #3 in  Nové Město na Moravě
 Pursuit winners:  Martin Fourcade (m) /  Anaïs Chevalier (f)
 Sprint winners:  Martin Fourcade (m) /  Tatiana Akimova (f)
 Mass start winners:  Martin Fourcade (m) /  Gabriela Koukalová (f)
 January 2–8: BWC #4 in  Oberhof, Germany
 Pursuit winners:  Martin Fourcade (m) /  Marie Dorin Habert (f)
 Sprint winners:  Julian Eberhard (m) /  Gabriela Koukalová (f)
 Mass start winners:  Simon Schempp (m) /  Gabriela Koukalová (f)
 January 10–15: BWC #5 in  Ruhpolding
 Pursuit winners:  Martin Fourcade (m) /  Kaisa Mäkäräinen (f)
 Sprint winners:  Martin Fourcade (m) /  Kaisa Mäkäräinen (f)
 Men's Relay winners:  (Ole Einar Bjørndalen, Vetle Sjåstad Christiansen, Henrik L'Abée-Lund, Emil Hegle Svendsen)
 Women's Relay winners:  (Vanessa Hinz, Maren Hammerschmidt, Franziska Preuß, Laura Dahlmeier)
 January 16–22: BWC #6 in  Antholz-Anterselva
 Individual winners:  Anton Shipulin (m) /  Laura Dahlmeier (f)
 Mass start winners:  Johannes Thingnes Bø (m) /  Nadine Horchler (f)
 Men's Relay winners:  (Erik Lesser, Benedikt Doll, Arnd Peiffer, Simon Schempp)
 Women's Relay winners:  (Vanessa Hinz, Maren Hammerschmidt, Franziska Hildebrand, Laura Dahlmeier)
 February 27 – March 5: BWC #7 in  Pyeongchang
 Pursuit winners:  Martin Fourcade (m) /  Laura Dahlmeier (f)
 Sprint winners:  Julian Eberhard (m) /  Laura Dahlmeier (f)
 Men's Relay winners:  (Jean-Guillaume Béatrix, Simon Fourcade, Simon Desthieux, Martin Fourcade)
 Women's Relay winners:  (Nadine Horchler, Maren Hammerschmidt, Denise Herrmann, Franziska Hildebrand)
 March 6–12: BWC #8 in  Kontiolahti
 Note: This event was supposed to be hosted in Tyumen, but the IBU took it back.
 Pursuit winners:  Arnd Peiffer (m) /  Laura Dahlmeier (f)
 Sprint winners:  Martin Fourcade (m) /  Tiril Eckhoff (f)
 Single Mixed Relay winners:  (Lisa Hauser & Simon Eder)
 Mixed Relay winners:  (Marie Dorin Habert, Anaïs Bescond, Simon Desthieux, & Quentin Fillon Maillet)
 March 13–19: BWC #9 (final) in  Oslo-Holmenkollen
 Pursuit winners:  Anton Shipulin (m) /  Mari Laukkanen (f)
 Sprint winners:  Johannes Thingnes Bø (m) /  Mari Laukkanen (f)
 Mass Start winners:  Martin Fourcade (m) /  Tiril Eckhoff (f)

2016–17 IBU Cup
 November 23–27, 2016: IBU Cup #1 in  Beitostølen
 Note: Both relay events here are cancelled.
 Men's 10 km Sprint winners:  Vetle Sjåstad Christiansen (#1) /  Matvey Eliseev (#2)
 Women's 7.5 km Sprint winners:  Denise Herrmann (#1) /  Markéta Davidová (#2)
 December 6–11, 2016: IBU Cup #2 in  Ridnaun-Val Ridanna
 Sprint winners:  Fredrik Gjesbakk (m) /  Anastasiya Merkushyna (f)
 Pursuit winners:  Aristide Begue (m) /  Uliana Kaisheva (f)
 Single Mixed Relay winners:  (Anastasiya Merkushyna, Artem Tyshchenko)
 Mixed 2x6 + 2x7.5 km Relay winners:  (Victoria Slivko, Uliana Kaisheva, Semen Suchilov, Alexey Slepov)
 December 14–17, 2016: IBU Cup #3 in  Obertilliach
 Individual winners:  Antonin Guigonnat (m) /  Karolin Horchler (f)
 Sprint winners:  Henrik L'Abée-Lund (m) /  Daria Virolaynen (f)
 January 3–8: IBU Cup #4 in  Martell-Val Martello
 Pursuit winners:  Alexandr Loginov (m) /  Daria Virolaynen (f)
 Sprint winners #1:  Andreas Dahlø Waernes (m) /  Fabienne Hartweger (f)
 Sprint winners #2:  Alexandr Loginov (m) /  Julia Simon (f)
 January 11–14: IBU Cup #5 in  Arber
 Note: Both relay events here are cancelled.
 Individual winners:  Alexandr Loginov (m) /  Irina Starykh (f)
 February 1–4: IBU Cup #6 in  Brezno-Osrblie
 Pursuit winners:  Kristoffer Skjelvik (m) /  Daria Virolaynen (f)
 Sprint winners:  Alexey Volkov (m) /  Denise Herrmann (f)
 February 28 – March 5: IBU Cup #7 in  Kontiolahti
 Individual winners:  Ondřej Moravec (m) /  Ekaterina Shumilova (f)
 Pursuit winners:  Alexandr Loginov (m) /  Anna Weidel (f)
 Sprint winners:  Alexander Povarnitsyn (m) /  Daria Virolaynen (f)
 March 7–12: IBU Cup #8 (final) in  Otepää
 Men's 10 km Sprint winner:  Alexandr Loginov (2 times)
 Women's 7.5 km Sprint winners:  Anastasia Zagoruiko (#1) /  Enora Latuillière (#2)
 Single Mixed Relay #1 winners:  (Thekla Brun-Lie & Martin Femsteinevik)
 Mixed Relay #1 winners:  (Karolin Horchler, Marion Deigentesch, Matthias Dorfer, David Zobel)
 Single Mixed Relay #2 winners:  (Anna Nikulina & Yury Shopin)
 Mixed Relay #2 winners:  (Sigrid Bilstad Neraasen, Rikke Andersen, Sindre Pettersen, & Henrik L'Abée-Lund)

2016–17 IBU Junior Cup
 December 9–11, 2016: IBU JC #1 in  Lenzerheide
 Junior individual winners:  Anton Dudchenko (m) /  Julia Simon (f)
 Junior sprint winners:  Vitaliy Trush (m) /  Caroline Colombo (f)
 December 14–17, 2016: IBU JC #2 in  Hochfilzen
 Junior sprint winners:  Erik Weick (m) /  Valeriia Vasnetcova (f)
 Junior pursuit winners:  Vitaliy Trush (m) /  Anna Weidel (f)
 Junior relay winners:  (Aleksandr Nasekin, Igor Malinovskii, & Nikita Porshnev) (m) /  (Camille Bened, Myrtille Begue, & Lena Arnaud) (f)
 January 26–29: IBU JC #3 (final) in  Pokljuka
 Junior men's sprint winners:  Kirill Streltsov (#1) /  Nikita Porshnev (#2)
 Junior women's sprint winners:  Ekaterina Moshkova (#1) /  Valeriia Vasnetcova (#2)
 Junior single mixed relay winners:  (Liudmila Ulybina & Semen Bey)
 Junior mixed relay winners:  (Ekaterina Sannikova, Valeriia Vasnetcova, Nikita Porshnev, & Igor Malinovskii)

Cross-country skiing

World Championships (XC)
 January 30 – February 5: Part of the 2017 Nordic Junior World Ski Championships in  Park City
  won both the gold and overall medal tallies.
 February 22 – March 5: Part of the FIS Nordic World Ski Championships 2017 in  Lahti
 Classical winners:  Iivo Niskanen (m) /  Marit Bjørgen (f)
 Skiathlon winners:  Sergey Ustiugov (m) /  Marit Bjørgen (f)
 Sprint winners:  Federico Pellegrino (m) /  Maiken Caspersen Falla (f)
 Team Sprint winners:  (Nikita Kryukov & Sergey Ustiugov) (m) /  (Heidi Weng & Maiken Caspersen Falla) (f)
 Men's 4 × 10 km relay winners:  (Didrik Tønseth, Niklas Dyrhaug, Martin Johnsrud Sundby, & Finn Hågen Krogh)
 Women's 4 × 5 km relay winners:  (Maiken Caspersen Falla, Heidi Weng, Astrid Uhrenholdt Jacobsen, & Marit Bjørgen)
 Mass Start winners:  Alex Harvey (m) /  Marit Bjørgen (f)

2016–17 Tour de Ski
 December 31, 2016 & January 1, 2017: TdS #1 in  Val Müstair
 Sprint Freestyle winners:  Sergey Ustiugov (m) /  Stina Nilsson (f)
 Classical Mass Start winners:  Sergey Ustiugov (m) /  Ingvild Flugstad Østberg (f)
 January 3 & 4: TdS #2 in  Oberstdorf
 Skiathlon winners:  Sergey Ustiugov (m) /  Stina Nilsson (f)
 Freestyle Pursuit winners:  Sergey Ustiugov (m) /  Stina Nilsson (f)
 January 6: TdS #3 in  Toblach #1
 Freestyle winners:  Sergey Ustiugov (m) /  Jessie Diggins (f)
 January 7 & 8: TdS #4 (final) in  Fiemme Valley
 Classical Mass Start winners:  Martin Johnsrud Sundby (m) /  Stina Nilsson (f)
 Freestyle Pursuit winners:  Sergey Ustiugov (m) /  Heidi Weng (f)

2016–17 FIS Cross-Country World Cup
 November 26, 2016 – March 19, 2017: 2016–17 FIS Cross-Country World Cup
 November 26 & 27, 2016: XCWC #1 in  Ruka
 Sprint Classical winners:  Pål Golberg (m) /  Stina Nilsson (f)
 Classical winners:  Iivo Niskanen (m) /  Marit Bjørgen (f)
 December 2–4, 2016: XCWC #2 in  Lillehammer
 Sprint Classical winners:  Calle Halfvarsson (m) /  Heidi Weng (f)
 Freestyle winners:  Calle Halfvarsson (m) /  Jessie Diggins (f)
 Classical Pursuit winners:  Martin Johnsrud Sundby (m) /  Heidi Weng (f)
 December 10 & 11, 2016: XCWC #3 in  Davos
 Freestyle Mass Start winners:  Martin Johnsrud Sundby (m) /  Ingvild Flugstad Østberg (f)
 Sprint Freestyle winners:  Sergey Ustiugov (m) /  Maiken Caspersen Falla (f)
 December 17 & 18, 2016: XCWC #4 in  La Clusaz
 Freestyle Mass Start winners:  Finn Hågen Krogh (m) /  Heidi Weng (f)
 Men's Team Relay winners:  I (Didrik Tønseth, Martin Johnsrud Sundby, Anders Gløersen, Finn Hågen Krogh)
 Women's Team Relay winners:  (Ingvild Flugstad Østberg, Marit Bjørgen, Ragnhild Haga, Heidi Weng)
 January 14 & 15: XCWC #5 in  Toblach #2
 Sprint Freestyle winners:  Sindre Bjørnestad Skar (m) /  Natalia Matveeva (f)
 Men's Team Sprint Freestyle winners:  (Len Väljas & Alex Harvey)
 Women's Team Sprint Freestyle winners:  (Yulia Belorukova & Natalia Matveeva)
 January 21 & 22: XCWC #6 in  Ulricehamn
 Freestyle winners:  Alex Harvey (m) /  Marit Bjørgen (f)
 Men's Team Relay winners:  (Simen Hegstad Krueger, Martin Johnsrud Sundby, Anders Gløersen, Finn Hågen Krogh)
 Women's Team Relay winners:  (Ingvild Flugstad Østberg, Heidi Weng, Astrid Uhrenholdt Jacobsen, Marit Bjørgen)
 January 28 & 29: XCWC #7 in  Falun
 Sprint Freestyle winners:  Federico Pellegrino (m) /  Stina Nilsson (f)
 Classical Mass Start winners:  Emil Iversen (m) /  Marit Bjørgen (f)
 February 3–5: XCWC #8 in  Pyeongchang
 Sprint Classical winners:  Gleb Retivykh (m) /  Anamarija Lampic (f)
 Skiathlon winners:  Petr Sedov (m) /  Justyna Kowalczyk (f)
 Men's Team Sprint Freestyle winners:  (Andrey Parfenov & Gleb Retivykh)
 Women's Team Sprint Freestyle winners:  (Elin Mohlin & Maria Nordstroem)
 February 18 & 19: XCWC #9 in  Otepää
 Sprint Freestyle winners:  Johannes Høsflot Klæbo (m) /  Stina Nilsson (f)
 Classical winners:  Martin Johnsrud Sundby (m) /  Marit Bjørgen (f)
 March 8: XCWC #10 in  Drammen
 Sprint Classical winners:  Eirik Brandsdal (m) /  Stina Nilsson (f)
 March 11 & 12: XCWC #11 in  Oslo
 Classical Mass Start winners:  Martin Johnsrud Sundby (m) /  Marit Bjørgen (f)
 March 17–19: XCWC #12 (final) in  Quebec City
 Note: Due to the release of the McLaren Report, Russia has voluntarily handed back the event to the FIS from Tyumen.
 Sprint Freestyle winners:  Alex Harvey (m) /  Stina Nilsson (f)
 Freestyle Pursuit & Classical Mass Start winners:  Johannes Høsflot Klæbo (m; 2 times) /  Marit Bjørgen (f; 2 times)

2016–17 FIS OPA Continental Cup
 December 10 & 11: OPA #1 in  Valdidentro
 Men's 15 km Classic winners:  Alexis Jeannerod (#1) /  Irineu Esteve Altimiras (#2)
 Women's 10 km Classic winners:  Justyna Kowalczyk (#1) /  Caterina Ganz (#2)
 December 16–18: OPA #2 in  Goms
 Men's 1.4 km Sprint Classic winner:  Anton Gafarov
 Women's 1.2 km Sprint Classic winner:  Natalya Matveyeva
 Men's 15 km Classic winner:  Giandomenico Salvadori
 Women's 10 km Classic winner:  Caterina Ganz
 Men's 15 km Freestyle winner:  Maicol Rastelli
 Women's 10 km Freestyle winner:  Sofie Krehl
 January 6–8: OPA #3 in  Planica
 Men's 1.2 km Sprint Freestyle winner:  Simi Hamilton
 Women's 1.2 km Sprint Freestyle winner:  Sophie Caldwell
 Men's 10 km Freestyle winner:  Jean Tiberghien
 Women's 10 km Freestyle winner:  Sara Pellegrini
 Men's 15 km Classic winner:  Dietmar Nöckler
 Women's 10 km Classic winner:  Francesca Baudin
 February 17–19: OPA #4 in  Zwiesel
 1.6 Sprint Classic winners:  Sergio Rigoni (m) /  Caterina Ganz (f)
 Men's 15 km Freestyle winner:  Paul Goalabre
 Women's 10 km Freestyle winner:  Monique Siegel
 Men's 15 km Classic Pursuit winner:  Giandomenico Salvadori
 Women's 10 km Classic Pursuit winner:  Caterina Ganz
 March 4 & 5: OPA #5 in  St. Ulrich
 Men's 15 km Freestyle winner:  Adrien Backscheider
 Women's 10 km Freestyle winner:  Lisa Unterweger
 Men's 30 km Classic winner:  Thomas Wick
 Women's 15 km Classic winner:  Theresa Eichhorn
 March 17–19: OPA #6 in  Seefeld in Tirol (final)
 Men's 3.3 km Freestyle winner:  Jean Tiberghien
 Women's 2.5 km Freestyle winner:  Caitlin Compton Gregg
 Men's 15 km Classic winner:  Maicol Rastelli
 Women's 10 km Classic winner:  Theresa Eichhorn
 Men's 15 km Freestyle Pursuit winner:  Maicol Rastelli
 Women's 10 km Freestyle Pursuit winner:  Theresa Eichhorn

2016 Australia/New Zealand Cup
 August 6 & 7: ANC #1 in  Perisher Ski Resort (part of Australian Championships)
 Speed 1 km winners:  Mark Pollock (m) /  Katerina Paul (f)
 Men's 10 km Free winner:  Mark Pollock
 Women's 5 km Free winner:  Lillian Boland
 August 20 & 21: ANC #2 in  Falls Creek, Victoria (part of Australian Championships)
 Speed 1 km Free winners:  Phillip Bellingham (m) /  Kelsey Phinney
 Men's 15 km winner:  Phillip Bellingham
 Women's 10 km winner:  Chisa Ōbayashi
 September 9–11: ANC #3 (final) in  Snow Farm
 Sprint Cross winners:  Andrew Newell (m) /  Ida Sargent (f)
 Men's 15 km Cross winner:  Andrew Newell
 Women's 10 km Cross winner:  Jessie Diggins
 Men's 10 km Free winner:  Simi Hamilton
 Women's 5 km winner:  Liz Stephen

2016–17 North American Cup
 December 10 & 11, 2016: NAC #1 in  Sovereign Lake Nordic Centre/Vernon, British Columbia
 Men's Sprint Classical winner:  Reese Hanneman
 Women's Sprint Classical winner:  Julia Kern
 Men's 15 km Freestyle winner:  Scott Patterson 
 Women's 10 km Freestyle winner:  Chelsea Holmes
 December 16–18, 2016: NAC #2 in  Rossland, British Columbia
 Men's 15 km Freestyle winner:  Evan Palmer-Charrette
 Women's 10 km Freestyle winner:  Chelsea Holmes
 Sprint Freestyle winners:  Andrew Newell (m) /  Erika Flowers (f)
 Men's 15 km Classical Pursuit winner:  Evan Palmer-Charrette
 Women's 10 km Classical Pursuit winner:  Chelsea Holmes
 January 20 & 21: NAC #3 in  Whistler Olympic Park
 Sprint Freestyle winners:  Jesse Cockney (m) /  Dahria Beatty (f)
 Men's 15 km Freestyle winner:  Andy Shields
 Women's 10 km Freestyle winner:  Emily Nishikawa
 February 3–5: NAC #4 (final) in  Nakkertok Nordic Ski Centre/Gatineau
 Sprint Classical winners:  Dominique Moncion-Groulx (m) /  Maya MacIsaac-Jones (f)
 Men's 15 km Classical winner:  Andy Shields
 Women's 10 km Classical winner:  Annie Hart
 Men's 20 km Freestyle winner:  Russell Kennedy
 Women's 15 km Freestyle winner:  Annie Hart

2016–17 Balkan Cup
 January 7 & 8: BC #1 in  Gerede
 Men's 10 km Classic winner:  Edi Dadić
 Women's 5 km Classic winner:  Vedrana Malec
 Men's 10 km Freestyle winner:  Edi Dadić
 Women's 5 km Freestyle winner:  Vedrana Malec
 January 17 & 18: BC #2 in  Zlatibor
 Men's 15 km Freestyle winner:  Veselin Tzinzov
 Women's 10 km Freestyle winner:  Vedrana Malec
 Men's 10 km Freestyle winner:  Veselin Tzinzov
 Women's 5 km Freestyle winner:  Vedrana Malec
 January 21 & 22: BC #3 in  Metsovo
 Men's 10 km Freestyle winner:  Veselin Tzinzov (2 times)
 Women's 5 km Freestyle winner:  Dejana Košarac (#1) /  Maria Tsakiri
 January 28 & 29: BC #4 in  Pale
 Men's 10 km Freestyle winner:  Veselin Tzinzov
 Women's 5 km Freestyle winner:  Sanja Kusmuk
 Men's 15 km Freestyle winner:  Veselin Tzinzov
 Women's 10 km Freestyle winner:  Sanja Kusmuk
 February 4 & 5: BC #5 in  Ravna Gora
 Men's 10 km Classic winner:  Veselin Tzinzov
 Women's 5 km Classic winner:  Lisa Unterweger
 Men's 10 km Freestyle winner:  Damir Rastić
 Women's 5 km Freestyle winner:  Lisa Unterweger
 February 14 & 15: BC #6 in  Mavrovo
 Men's 10 km Freestyle winners:  Edi Dadić (#1) /  Veselin Tzinzov (#2)
 Women's 5 km Freestyle winners:  Dejana Košarac (#1) /  Sanja Kusmuk (#2)
 March 24 & 25: BC #7 (final) in  Bansko
 Men's 10 km Classic winner:  Veselin Tzinzov
 Women's 5 km Classic winner:  Nansi Okoro
 Men's 10 km Freestyle winner:  Damir Rastić
 Women's 5 km Freestyle winner:  Stefani Popova

2016–17 Scandinavian Cup
 December 9–11: SCAN #1 in  Lillehammer
 Men's 1.5 km Sprint Classic winner:  Sindre Odberg Palm
 Women's 1.3 km Sprint Classic winner:  Anna Dyvik
 Men's 10 km Freestyle winner:  Daniel Stock
 Women's 5 km Freestyle winner:  Charlotte Kalla
 Men's 30 km Classic winner:  Niklas Dyrhaug
 Women's 15 km Classic winner:  Charlotte Kalla
 January 6–8: SCAN #2 in  Lahti
 1 km Sprint Classic winners:  Oskar Svensson (m) /  Hanna Falk (f)
 Men's 15 km Classic winner:  Iivo Niskanen
 Women's 10 km Classic winner:  Justyna Kowalczyk
 March 3–5: SCAN #3 (final) in  Madona
 1 km Sprint Freestyle winners:  Håvard Solås Taugbøl (m) /  Anna Dyvik (f)
 Men's 10 km Classic winner:  Daniel Stock
 Women's 5 km Classic winner:  Maria Nordstroem
 Men's 15 km Freestyle Pursuit winner:  Mathias Rundgreen
 Women's 10 km Freestyle Pursuit winner:  Linn Sömskar

2016–17 Slavic Cup
 December 16–18: SC #1 in  Štrbské pleso
 Men's 1.6 km Sprint Classic winners:  Aliaksandr Voranau (#1) /  Jan Barton (#2)
 Women's 1.4 km Sprint Classic winners:  Alena Procházková (2 times)
 Men's 10 km Freestyle winner:  Mikhail Kuklin
 Women's 7.5 km Freestyle winner:  Alena Procházková
 February 18 & 19: SC #2 in  Zakopane
 Men's 10 km Classic winner:  Andrej Segeč
 Women's 5 km Classic winner:  Urszula Łętocha
 Men's 15 km Freestyle winner:  Andrzej Pradziad
 Women's 10 km Freestyle winner:  Urszula Łętocha
 February 24–26: SC #3 in  Jablonec nad Nisou
 Men's 3 km Freestyle winner:  Dušan Kožíšek
 Women's 2 km Freestyle winner:  Zuzana Staňková
 Men's 10 km Classic winner:  Luděk Šeller
 Women's 5 km Classic winner:  Urszula Łętocha
 Men's 10 km Freestyle Pursuit winner:  Adam Fellner
 Women's 5 km Freestyle Pursuit winner:  Anna Sixtová
 March 11 & 12: SC #4 (final) in  Harrachov
 1 km Sprint Classic winners:  Michal Novák (m) /  Karolína Grohová (f)
 Men's 15 km Freestyle Pursuit winner:  Martin Jakš
 Women's 10 km Freestyle winner:  Kateřina Beroušková

2016–17 Eastern Europe Cup
 November 20–24, 2016: EEC #1 in  Vershina Tea
 Men's 1.7 km Free winner:  Ivan Yakimushkin
 Women's 1.3 km Free winner:  Polina Nekrasova
 Men's 10 km Free winner:  Aleksey Chervotkin
 Women's 5 km Free winner:  Anna Nechaevskaya
 Men's 1.7 km Classic winner:  Aleksey Chervotkin
 Women's 1.3 km Classic winner:  Polina Nekrasova
 Men's 15 km Classic winner:  Alexey Vitsenko
 Women's 10 km Classic winner:  Mariya Guschina
 December 20–22, 2016: EEC #2 in  Sianky
 Men's 10 km Classic winner:  Yury Astapenka
 Women's 5 km Classic winner:  Tetyana Antypenko
 Men's 15 km Classic winner:  Yury Astapenka
 Women's 10 km Classic winner:  Valentyna Shevchenko
 1.6 km Sprint Freestyle winners:  Ruslan Perekhoda (m) /  Tetyana Antypenko
 December 24–28, 2016: EEC #3 in  Krasnogorsk
 1.4 km Sprint Classic #1 winners:  Alexander Panzhinskiy (m) /  Natalya Matveyeva (f)
 1.4 km Sprint Classic #2 winners:  Alexander Bolshunov (m) /  Natalya Matveyeva (f)
 Men's 15 km Freestyle winner:  Andrey Melnichenko
 Women's 10 km Freestyle winner:  Anna Nechaevskaya
 Men's 30 km Classic winner:  Alexander Bolshunov 
 Women's 15 km Classic winner:  Olga Rocheva
 January 11–15: EEC #4 in  Minsk
 1.5 km Sprint Freestyle winners:  Andrey Parfenov (m) /  Yulia Tikhonova (f)
 Men's 15 km Classic winners:  Nikita Stupak (#1) /  Vladislav Skobelev (#2)
 Women's 10 km Classic winners:  Justyna Kowalczyk (#1) /  Anna Nechaevskaya (#2)
 February 10: EEC #5 in  Krasnogorsk
 Men's 15 km Classic winner:  Alexey Vitsenko
 Women's 10 km Classic winner:  Zhanna Muraveva
 February 12: EEC #6 in  Moscow
 1.4 km Sprint Freestyle winners:  Nikolay Morilov (m) /  Maria Davydenkova (f)
 February 25 – March 1: EEC #7 (final) in  Syktyvkar
 Men's 15 km Freestyle winner:  Ermil Vokuev
 Women's 10 km Freestyle winner:  Anna Nechaevskaya
 1.4 km Sprint Freestyle winners:  Andrey Krasnov (m) /  Natalia Nepryaeva (f)
 Skiathlon winners:  Denis Spitsov (m) /  Anna Nechaevskaya (f)

2016–17 Far East Cup
 December 16 & 17: FEC #1 in  Alpensia Resort
 Sprint Classic winners:  Nobuhito Kashiwabara (m) /  Nanase Fujita (f)
 Men's 15 km Freestyle winner:  Hikari Fujinoki
 Women's 10 km Freestyle winner:  Lee Chae-won
 December 26 & 27: FEC #2 in  Otoineppu, Hokkaido
 Men's 10 km Classic winners:  Akira Lenting (#1) /  Keishin Yoshida (#2)
 Women's 5 km Classic winners:  Masako Ishida (2 times)
 January 6: FEC #3 in  Sapporo
 Men's 10 km Classic winner:  Keishin Yoshida
 Women's 5 km Classic winner:  Yuki Kobayashi
 January 7: FEC #4 in  Sapporo
 1.4 km Sprint Classic winners:  Nobuhito Kashiwabara (m) /  Masako Ishida
 January 8: FEC #5 in  Sapporo
 Men's 15 km Freestyle winner:  Keishin Yoshida
 Women's 10 km Freestyle winner:  Masako Ishida
 January 15 & 16: FEC #6 (final) in  Alpensia Resort
 Men's 10 km Classic winner:  Akira Lenting
 Women's 5 km Classic winner:  Lee Chae-won
 Men's 15 km Freestyle winner:  Akira Lenting
 Women's 10 km Freestyle winner:  Lee Chae-won

2016–17 USSA Super Tour
 December 3 & 4: UST #1 in  Rendezvous Ski Trails/West Yellowstone, Montana
 Note: This event replaced Bozeman, Montana.
 1.5 km Freestyle winners:  Matthew Gelso (m) /  Jennie Bender (f)
 Men's 15 km Classic winner:  Matthew Gelso
 Women's 10 km Classic winner:  Elizabeth Guiney
 January 21 & 22: UST #2 in  Soda Springs
 Sprint Classic winners:  Benjamin Lustgarten (m) /  Jennie Bender (f)
 February 17–19: UST #3 in  Al Quaal Recreation Area
 1.6 km Freestyle winners:  Tyler Kornfield (m) /  Julia Kern (f)
 Men's 10 km Classic winner:  David Norris
 Women's 5 km Classic winner:  Kaitlynn Miller
 March 27 – April 2: UST #4 in  Birch Hill Recreation Area/Fairbanks (final)
 Skiathlon winners:  Scott Patterson (m) /  Jessie Diggins (f)
 Men's 1.5 km Freestyle winner:  Logan Hanneman
 Women's 1.4 km Freestyle winner:  Jessie Diggins
 Men's 50 km Must Start winner:  Scott Patterson
 Women's 30 km Must Start winner:  Jessie Diggins

Freestyle skiing

World Championships (Freestyle)
 March 6–19: FIS Freestyle Ski and Snowboarding World Championships 2017 in  Sierra Nevada
 Aerials winners:  Jonathon Lillis (m) /  Ashley Caldwell (f)
 Half-pipe winners:  Aaron Blunk (m) /  Ayana Onozuka (f)
 Moguls winners:  Ikuma Horishima (m) /  Britteny Cox (f)
 Dual Moguls winners:  Ikuma Horishima (m) /  Perrine Laffont (f)
 Ski Cross winners:  Victor Öhling Norberg (m) /  Sandra Näslund (f)
 Slopestyle winners:  McRae Williams (m) /  Tess Ledeux (f)
 March 26: FIS Junior Freestyle Ski World Championships 2017 (Half-pipe only) in  Crans-Montana
 Half-pipe winners:  Rafael Kreienbuehl (m) /  Kelly Sildaru (f)
 April 3–7: FIS Junior Freestyle Ski World Championships 2017 (AE, MO, DM, SS, & SX events) in  Chiesa in Valmalenco
 Aerials winners:  Dzmitry Mazurkevich (m) /  Liubov Nikitina (f)
 Moguls winners:  Jack Kariotis (m) /  Trudy Mickel (f)
 Dual Moguls winners:  Riku Voutilainen (m) /  Olivia Giaccio (f)
 Slopestyle winners:  Taisei Yamamoto (m) /  Kelly Sildaru (f)
 Ski Cross winners:  Florian Wilmsmann (m) /  Sandra Näslund (f)

FIS Freestyle Skiing World Cup
 December 9, 2016 – March 26, 2017: 2016–17 FIS Freestyle Skiing World Cup

Moguls and Aerials
 December 10, 2016 – March 4, 2017: 2016–17 FIS Moguls and Aerials World Cup Schedule
 December 10, 2016: MAWC #1 in  Ruka
 Moguls winners:  Mikaël Kingsbury (m) /  Britteny Cox (f)
 December 17 & 18, 2016: MAWC #2 in  Beijing (Beida Lake)
 Individual aerials #1 winners:  Anton Kushnir (m) /  Xu Mengtao (f)
 Individual aerials #2 winners:  Qi Guangpu (m) /  Danielle Scott (f)
 Team aerials winners:  (Aleksandra Orlova, Liubov Nikitina, Maxim Burov)
 January 13 & 14: MAWC #3 in  Lake Placid, New York
 Moguls winners:  Dmitry Reiherd (m) /  Britteny Cox (f)
 Aerials winners:  Anton Kushnir (m) /  Ashley Caldwell (f)
 January 21: MAWC #4 in  Val Saint-Côme
 Moguls winners:  Mikaël Kingsbury (m) /  Justine Dufour-Lapointe (f)
 January 28: MAWC #5 in  Calgary
 Moguls winners:  Matt Graham (m) /  Britteny Cox (f)
 February 2–4: MAWC #6 in  Deer Valley
 Moguls winners:  Mikaël Kingsbury (m) /  Morgan Schild (f)
 Aerials winners:  Qi Guangpu (m) /  Lydia Lassila (f)
 Dual Moguls winners:  Mikaël Kingsbury (m) /  Britteny Cox (f)
 February 10 & 11: MAWC #7 in  Bokwang
 Aerials winners:  Anton Kushnir (m) /  Xu Mengtao (f)
 Moguls winners:  Mikaël Kingsbury (m) /  Britteny Cox (f)
 February 18 & 19: MAWC #8 in  Tazawako
 Moguls winners:  Mikaël Kingsbury (m) /  Britteny Cox (f)
 Dual Moguls winners:  Mikaël Kingsbury (m) /  Jaelin Kauf (f)
 February 25: MAWC #9 in  Minsk
 Aerials winners:  WANG Xindi (m) /  Lydia Lassila (f)
 February 25 & 26: MAWC #10 in  Thaiwoo (Hebei)
 Moguls winners:  Mikaël Kingsbury (m) /  Perrine Laffont (f)
 Dual Moguls winners:  Mikaël Kingsbury (m) /  Britteny Cox (f)
 March 4: MAWC #11 (final) in  Moscow
 Aerials winners:  ZHOU Hang (m) /  Lydia Lassila (f)

Half-pipe, Big air, and Slopestyle
 September 2, 2016 – March 25, 2017: 2016–17 FIS Half-pipe, Big air, and Slopestyle World Cup Schedule
 September 2 & 3, 2016: HB&SWC #1 in  El Colorado
 Big Air winners:  Henrik Harlaut (m) /  Emma Dahlström (f)
 November 11, 2016: HB&SWC #2 in  Milan
 Big Air winners:  Kai Mahler (m) /  Lisa Zimmermann (f)
 December 2, 2016: HB&SWC #3 in  Mönchengladbach
 Big Air winners:  Henrik Harlaut (m) /  Silvia Bertagna (f)
 December 15 & 17, 2016: HB&SWC #4 in  Copper Mountain
 Half-pipe winners:  Kevin Rolland (m) /  Marie Martinod (f)
 January 13 & 14: HB&SWC #5 in  Font-Romeu
 Slopestyle winners:  McRae Williams (m) /  Tess Ledeux (f)
 January 26–28: HB&SWC #6 in  Seiser Alm
 Slopestyle winners:  Colby Stevenson (m) /  Sarah Hoefflin (f)
 February 1–5: HB&SWC #7 in  Mammoth Mountain Ski Area
 Note: The men's slopestyle event here was cancelled.
 Half-pipe winners:  Torin Yater-Wallace (m) /  Marie Martinod (f)
 Women's Slopestyle winner:  Maggie Voisin
 February 9–12: HB&SWC #8 in  Quebec City
 Big Air winners:  Kai Mahler (m) /  Mathilde Gremaud (f)
 Slopestyle winners:  Andri Ragettli (m) /  Johanne Killi (f)
 February 16 & 18: HB&SWC #9 in  Bokwang
 Half-pipe winners:  Torin Yater-Wallace (m) /  Marie Martinod (f)
 March 2 & 3: HB&SWC #10 in  Silvaplana
 Slopestyle winners:  Teal Harle (m) /  Isabel Atkin (f)
 March 5 & 7: HB&SWC #11 in  Tignes
 Half-pipe winners:  Alex Ferreira (m) /  Cassie Sharpe (f)
 March 24 & 25: HB&SWC #12 (final) in  Myrkdalen-Voss
 Men's Big Air winners:  Christian Nummedal (#1) /  Birk Ruud (#2)
 Women's Big Air winner:  Emma Dahlström (2 times)

Ski cross
 December 8, 2016 – March 5, 2017: 2016–17 FIS Ski Cross World Cup Schedule
 December 8–10, 2016: SCWC #1 in  Val Thorens
 Ski cross #1 winners:  Jean-Frédéric Chapuis (m) /  Marielle Thompson (f)
 Ski cross #2 winners:  Alex Fiva (m) /  Anna Holmlund (f)
 December 12 & 13, 2016: SCWC #2 in  Arosa
 Ski cross winners:  Romain Detraz (m) /  Marielle Thompson (f)
 December 16 & 17, 2016: SCWC #3 in  Montafon
 Ski cross winners:  Jean-Frédéric Chapuis (m) /  Marielle Thompson (f)
 December 20–22, 2016: SCWC #4 in  Innichen
 Ski cross winners:  Filip Flisar (m; 2 times) /  Heidi Zacher (f; 2 times)
 January 14 & 15: SCWC #5 in  Watles
 Ski cross #1 winners:  Armin Niederer (m) /  Sandra Näslund (f)
 Ski cross #2 winners:  Alex Fiva (m) /  Marielle Thompson (f)
 February 3–5: SCWC #6 in  Feldberg
 Note: The second women's ski cross event here was cancelled.
 Men's Ski cross winner:  Jean-Frédéric Chapuis (2 times)
 Women's Ski cross winner:  Heidi Zacher 
 February 9–12: SCWC #7 in  Idre
 Ski cross #1 winners:  Alex Fiva (m) /  Sandra Näslund (f)
 Ski cross #2 winners:  Brady Leman (m) /  Marielle Thompson (f)
 February 24 & 25: SCWC #8 in  Sunny Valley (Miass)
 Ski cross winners:  Arnaud Bovolenta (m) /  Marielle Thompson (f)
 March 5: SCWC #9 (final) in  Blue Mountain
 Ski cross winners:  Brady Leman (m) /  Marielle Thompson (f)

2016–17 Europa Cup
 November 26: FSEC #1 in  Stubai
 Slopestyle winners:  Antoine Adelisse (m) /  Coline Ballet Baz (f)
 November 26 & 27: FSEC #2 in  Pitztal
 Ski Cross winners:  Armin Niederer (m) /  Daniela Maier (f)
 December 1 & 2: FSEC #3 in  Ruka
 Aerials #1 winners:  Maxim Burov (m) /  Danielle Scott (f)
 Aerials #2 winners:  Maxim Burov (m) /  Danielle Scott (f)
 January 11 & 12: FSEC #4 in  Val Thorens
 Men's Ski Cross winners:  Bryan Zooler (#1) /  François Place (#2)
 Women's Ski Cross winners:  Amelie Schneider (#1) /  Lisa Andersson (#2)
 January 20–22: FSEC #5 in  St Anton am Arlberg
 Big Air winners:  Lukas Müllauer (m) /  Laura Wallner (f)
 Slopestyle #1 winners:  Joona Sipola (m) /  Laura Wallner (f)
 Slopestyle #2 winners:  Carles Aguareles Loan (m) /  Jennie-Lee Burmansson (f)
 January 26 & 27: FSEC #6 in  Lenk im Simmental
 Men's Ski Cross winners:  Jamie Prebble (#1) /  Ryan Regez (#2)
 Women's Ski Cross winners:  Lisa Andersson (2 times)
 January 28 & 29: FSEC #7 in  Albiez-Montrond
 Moguls winners:  Evgeniy Gedrovich (m) /  Kristine Gullachsen (f)
 Dual Moguls winners:  Gaël Gaiddon (m) /  Thea Wallberg (f)
 February 1–3: FSEC #8 in  Bardonecchia
 Ski Cross #1 winners:  François Place (m) /  Amelie Schneider (f)
 Ski Cross #1 winners:  François Place (m) /  Lisa Andersson (f)
 February 9–12: FSEC #9 in  Minsk
 Aerials #1 winners:  Artsiom Bashlakou (m) /  Carol Bouvard (f)
 Aerials #2 winners:  Artsiom Bashlakou (m) /  Carol Bouvard (f)
 Team Aerials winners:  (Hanna Yauseyenka, Dzmitry Mazurkevich, Artsiom Bashlakou)
 February 11 & 12: FSEC #10 in  Gaißau
 Moguls #1 winners:  Oskar Elofsson (m) /  Ayaulum Amrenova (f)
 Moguls #2 winners:  Loke Nilsson (m) /  Ayaulum Amrenova (f)
 February 11 & 12: FSEC #11 in  Grasgehren
 Cancelled
 February 15–18: FSEC #12 in  Prato Leventina
 Moguls winners:  Andrey Uglovski (m) /  Ayaulum Amrenova (f)
 Dual Moguls #1 winners:  Evgeniy Gedrovich (m) /  Léonie Gerken Schofield (f)
 Dual Moguls #2 winners:  Albin Holmgren (m) /  Makayla Gerken-Schofield (f)
 February 18: FSEC #13 in  Bischofswiesen
 Big Air winners:  Vincent Veile (m) /  Kea Deike Kuehnel (f)
 February 18 & 19: FSEC #14 in  Ebingen
 Ski Cross #1 winners:  Robert Winkler (m) /  Alexandra Edebo (f)
 Ski Cross #2 winners:  François Place (m) /  Alexandra Edebo (f)
 March 8 & 9: FSEC #15 in  Saint-François-Longchamp
 Ski Cross winners:  Bastien Midol (m) /  Anna Wörner (f)
 March 10 & 11: FSEC #16 in  Vogel
 Slopestyle #1 winners:  Rasmus Dalberg Jørgensen (m) /  Elisabeth Gram (f)
 Slopestyle #2 winners:  Yuri Silvestri (m) /  Sophia Insam (f)
 March 11 & 12: FSEC #17 in  Kungsberget
 Moguls winners:  Loke Nilsson (m) /  Frida Lundblad (f)
 Dual Moguls winners:  Albin Holmgren (m) /  Frida Lundblad (f)
 March 17 & 18: FSEC #18 in  Pamporovo
 Note: The women's slopestyle events were cancelled.
 Men's Slopestyle winner:  Brandon Davis (2 times)
 March 18 & 19: FSEC #19 in  Mora
 Ski Cross #1 winners:  Robert Winkler (m) /  Lisa Andersson
 Ski Cross #2 winners:  Morgan Guipponi-Barfety (m) /  Lisa Andersson
 March 19 & 20: FSEC #20 in  Jyväskylä
 Dual Moguls #1 winners:  Jussi Penttala (m) /  Frida Lundblad (f)
 Dual Moguls #2 winners:  Jimi Salonen (m) /  Thea Wallberg (f)
 March 24–27: FSEC #21 in  Airolo
 Aerials #1 winners:  Dimitri Isler (m) /  Zhanbota Aldabergenova (f)
 Aerials #2 winners:  Noe Roth (m) /  Zhanbota Aldabergenova (f)
 Aerials #3 winners:  Nicolas Gygax (m) /  Zhanbota Aldabergenova (f)
 March 25 & 26: FSEC #22 in  Pec pod Sněžkou
 Slopestyle winners:  Elias Syrjä (m) /  Natália Šlepecká (f)
 March 30 & 31: FSEC #23 in  Chiesa in Valmalenco
 Aerials #1 winners:  Maxim Burov (m) /  Liubov Nikitina (f)
 Aerials #2 winners:  Dzmitry Mazurkevich (m) /  Liubov Nikitina (f)
 March 30 & 31: FSEC #24 (final) in  Livigno
 Slopestyle winners:  Colin Wili (m; 2 times) /  Elisa Nakab (f; 2 times)

2016–17 Nor-Am Cup
 December 14–18: NAC #1 in  Utah Olympic Park
 Aerials #1 winners:  Zachary Surdell (m) /  Winter Vinecki (f)
 Aerials #2 winners:  Nik Seemann (m) /  Winter Vinecki (f)
 January 6–8: NAC #2 in  Sunridge Ski Area
 Ski Cross #1 winners:  Trent McCarthy (m) /  India Sherret (f)
 Ski Cross #2 winners:  Trent McCarthy (m) /  Zoe Chore (f)
 January 13 & 14: NAC #3 in  Tabor Mountain Ski Resort
 Men's Ski Cross winners:  Kevin MacDonald (2 times)
 Women's Ski Cross winners:  India Sherret (#1) /  Leah Emaus (#2)
 January 20: NAC#4/Super Continental Cup in  Solitude Mountain Resort
 Ski Cross winners:  David Duncan (m) /  Marielle Thompson (f)
 February 11 & 12: NAC #5 in  Killington Ski Resort
 Moguls winners:  Emerson Smith (m) /  Valérie Gilbert (f)
 Dual Moguls winners:  Gabriel Dufresne (m) /  Lane Stoltzner (f)
 February 13–17: NAC #6 in  Sunday River Resort
 Ski Cross #1 winners:  Kevin MacDonald (m) /  Tiana Gairns (f)
 Ski Cross #2 winners:  Reece Howden (m) /  Tiana Gairns (f)
 February 14 & 15: NAC #7 in  Val Saint-Côme Ski Resort #1
 Aerials #1 winners:  Thomas Coe (m) /  Erica Stemler (f)
 Aerials #2 winners:  Thomas Coe (m) /  Tyra Izor (f)
 February 16–18: NAC #8 in  Aspen/Buttermilk
 Slopestyle winners:  Ethan Swadburg (m) /  Elena Gaskell (f)
 Big Air winners:  Mac Forehand (m) /  Grace Henderson (f)
 Halfpipe winners:  Birk Irving (m) /  Abigale Hansen (f)
 February 18 & 19: NAC #9 in  Val Saint-Côme Ski Resort #2
 Moguls winners:  Elliot Vaillancourt (m) /  Berkley Brown (f)
 Dual Moguls winners:  Simon Lemieux (m) /  Valérie Gilbert (f)
 February 19 & 20: NAC #10 in  Lake Placid, New York
 Aerials #1 winners:  Patrick O'Flynn (m) /  Megan Nick (f)
 Aerials #2 winners:  Nicholas Novak (m) /  Kira Tanghe (f)
 February 20–25: NAC #11 in  Ski Cooper
 Ski Cross #1 winners:  Kevin MacDonald (m) /  India Sherret (f)
 Ski Cross #2 winners:  Reece Howden (m) /  India Sherret (f)
 February 22–26: NAC #12 in  Northstar California Resort
 Moguls winners:  Emerson Smith (m) /  Lane Stoltzner (f)
 Dual Moguls winners:  Troy Tully (m) /  Avital Shimko (f)
 February 24–26: NAC #13 in  Canada Olympic Park
 Halfpipe winners:  Nick Goepper (m) /  Carly Margulies (f)
 Slopestyle winners:  Philippe Langevin (m) /  Sofia Tchernetsky (f)
 February 27 – March 3: NAC #14 in  Utah Olympic Park
 Aerials #1 winners:  Nicholas Novak (m) /  Madison Varmette (f)
 Aerials #2 winners:  Nicholas Novak (m) /  Madison Varmette (f)
 March 3 & 4: NAC #15 in  Mount St. Louis Moonstone
 Slopestyle winners:  Christian Stormgaard (m) /  Sofia Tchernetsky (f)
 March 4 & 5: NAC #16: in  Apex Mountain Resort
 Moguls winners:  Casey Andringa (m) /  Avital Shimko (f)
 Dual Moguls winners:  Joel Hedrick (m) /  Berkley Brown (f)
 March 7 & 8: NAC #17 in  Seven Springs Mountain Resort
 Slopestyle winners:  Philippe Langevin (m) /  Caroline Claire (f)
 March 7–9: NAC #18 (final) in  Blue Mountain
 Ski Cross #1 winners:  Brant Crossan (m) /  Marielle Thompson (f)
 Ski Cross #2 winners:  Mathieu Leduc (m) /  Tania Prymak (f)

2016 FIS Freestyle Australia/New Zealand Cup
 August 2–5: ANC #1 in  Perisher Ski Resort #1
 This event was cancelled due to unseasonable warm temperatures and rainfall.
 August 30 – September 2: ANC #2 in  Hotham Alpine Resort
 Ski Cross #1 winners:  Tyler Wallasch (m) /  Sami Kennedy-Sim (f)
 Ski Cross #2 winners:  Anton Grimus (m) /  Sami Kennedy-Sim (f)
 September 3: ANC #3 in  Mount Buller Alpine Resort
 Dual Moguls winners:  Brodie Summers (m) /  Britteny Cox (f)
 September 12–16: ANC #4 (final) in  Cardrona Alpine Resort
 Slopestyle #1 winners:  James Woods (m) /  Kelly Sildaru (f)
 Slopestyle #2 winners:  James Woods (m) /  Kelly Sildaru (f)
 Halfpipe winners:  Taylor Seaton (m) /  Kelly Sildaru (f)

2016 FIS Freestyle South American Cup
 August 4–6: SAC #1 in  La Parva
 Ski Cross winners #1:  Ned Ireland (m) /  Magdalena Casas-Cordero (f)
 Ski Cross winners #2:  Ned Ireland (m) /  Magdalena Casas-Cordero (f)
 August 17–20: SAC #2 in  Cerro Catedral #1
 Ski Cross winners #1:  Thomas Hayward (m) /  Karolina Riemen
 Ski Cross winners #2:  Justin Wallisch (m) /  Karolina Riemen
 August 26 & 27: SAC #3 in  El Colorado
 Big Air #1 winners:  Mateo Cremer (m) /  Zuzana Stromková (f)
 Big Air #2 winners:  Mateo Cremer (m) /  Dominique Ohaco (f)
 September 12–14: SAC #4 (final) in  Cerro Catedral #2
 Slopestyle winners #1:  Mateo Cremer (m) 
 Slopestyle winners #2:  Andre Hamm (m) /  Elena Kostenko (f)

Nordic combined

World Championships (NC)
 January 30 – February 5: Part of the 2017 Nordic Junior World Ski Championships in  Park City, Utah
 Individual normal hill/10 km winner:  Arttu Mäkiaho
 Individual normal hill/5 km winner:  Vinzenz Geiger
 Team normal hill/4 × 5 km winners:  (Samuel Mraz, Marc-Luis Rainer, Florian Dagn, & Mika Vermeulen)
 February 22 – March 5: Part of the FIS Nordic World Ski Championships 2017 in  Lahti
 Individual normal hill/10 km winner:  Johannes Rydzek
 Individual large hill/10 km winner:  Johannes Rydzek
 Team normal hill/4 × 5 km winners:  (Björn Kircheisen, Eric Frenzel, Fabian Rießle, & Johannes Rydzek)
 Team sprint large hill/2 × 7.5 km winners:  (Eric Frenzel & Johannes Rydzek)

2016–17 FIS Nordic Combined World Cup
 August 27, 2016 – March 19, 2017: 2016–17 FIS Nordic Combined World Cup Schedule
 August 27 & 28, 2016: NCWC #1 in  Oberwiesenthal
 Men's individual winner:  Jarl Magnus Riiber
 Men's team winners:  (Björn Kircheisen & Eric Frenzel)
 August 31, 2016: NCWC #2 in  Villach
 Men's individual winner:  Mario Seidl
 September 2 & 3, 2016: NCWC #3 in  Oberstdorf
 Winners #1:  Jarl Magnus Riiber (m) /  Jenny Nowak (f)
 Winners #2:  Jan Andersen (m) /  Timna Moser (f)
 Winners #3:  Jarl Magnus Riiber (m) /  Jenny Nowak (f)
 Winners #4:  Jan Andersen (m) /  Lisa Eder (f)
 Men's individual winners:  Atte Kettunen (#1) /  Dmytro Mazurchuk (#2)
 November 26 & 27, 2016: NCWC #4 in  Ruka
 Men's individual winner:  Johannes Rydzek (2 times)
 December 2–4, 2016: NCWC #5 in  Lillehammer
 Men's individual winner:  Eric Frenzel (2 times)
 Men's team winners:  (Björn Kircheisen, Eric Frenzel, Fabian Rießle, Johannes Rydzek)
 December 17 & 18, 2016: NCWC #6 in  Ramsau
 Men's individual winners:  Johannes Rydzek (#1) /  Eric Frenzel (#2)
 January 7 & 8: NCWC #7 in  Lahti
 Men's individual winners:  Eric Frenzel (#1) /  Fabian Rießle (#2)
 January 13–15: NCWC #8 in  Fiemme Valley
 Men's individual winner:  Eric Frenzel (2 times)
 Men's team winners:  (Espen Andersen & Jørgen Graabak)
 January 21 & 22: NCWC #9 in  Chaux-Neuve
 Men's individual winners:  Johannes Rydzek (#1) /  Fabian Rießle (#2)
 January 27–29: NCWC #10 in  Seefeld
 Men's individual winners:  Johannes Rydzek (2 wins) /  Eric Frenzel (1 win)
 February 4 & 5: NCWC #11 in  Pyeongchang
 Men's individual winner:  Johannes Rydzek (2 times)
 February 10 & 11: NCWC #12 in  Sapporo
 Men's individual winners:  Björn Kircheisen (#1) /  Akito Watabe (#2)
 March 11: NCWC #13 in  Oslo
 Men's individual winner:  Akito Watabe
 March 15: NCWC #14 in  Trondheim
 Men's individual winner:  Eric Frenzel
 March 18 & 19: NCWC #15 (final) in  Schonach
 Men's individual winner:  Eric Frenzel (2 times)

2016–17 FIS Nordic Combined Grand Prix
 August 27 & 28, 2016: NCGP #1 in  Oberwiesenthal
 Winner:  Jarl Magnus Riiber
 Teams winners:  1 (Björn Kircheisen, Eric Frenzel)
 August 31, 2016: NCGP #2 in  Villach
 Winner:  Mario Seidl
 September 2 & 3, 2016: NCGP #3 (final) in  Oberstdorf
 Winner #1:  Jarl Magnus Riiber
 Winner #2:  Jarl Magnus Riiber

2016–17 FIS Nordic Combined Continental Cup
 December 15 & 18: COC #1 in  Klingenthal
 Winner #1:  Maximilian Pfordte
 Winner #2:  Tobias Simon
 Winner #3:  Go Yamamoto
 January 7 & 8: COC #2 in  Hoeydalsmo
 Winner #1:  Truls Soenstehagen Johansen
 Winner #2:  Hugo Buffard
 January 14 & 15: COC #3 in  Rukatunturi
 Winner #1:  Lukas Greiderer
 Winner #2:  Sindre Ure Søtvik
 January 21 & 22: COC #4 in  Otepää
 Winner #1:  Kristjan Ilves
 Winner #2:  Martin Fritz
 February 11 & 12: COC #5 in  Eisenerz
 Winner #1:  Kristjan Ilves
 Winner #2:  Kristjan Ilves
 February 18 & 19: COC #6 in  Planica
 Winner #1:  Lukas Klapfer
 Winner #2:  Lukas Klapfer
 March 10–12: COC #7 (final) in  Nizhny Tagil
 Winner #1:  Harald Lemmerer
 Winner #2:  Tobias Simon
 Winner #3:  Tobias Simon

2016–17 FIS Nordic Combined Alpen Cup
 August 8, 2016: NCAP #1 in  Klingenthal
 Winner:  Lisa Eder
 August 12, 2016: NCAP #2 in  Bischofsgrün
 Winner:  Lisa Eder
 September 17 & 18, 2016: NCAP #3 in  Winterberg
 Winner #1:  Justin Moczarski
 Winner #2:  Justin Moczarski
 October 1 & 2, 2016: NCAP #4 in  Hinterzarten
 Winner #1:  Simon Hüttel
 Winner #2:  Christian Deuschl
 December 17 & 18: NCAP #5 in  Seefeld in Tirol
 Winner #1:  Mika Vermeulen
 Winner #2:  Vid Vrhovnik
 December 17 & 18: NCAP #6 in  Rastbuechl
 Winner:  Lisa Moreschini
 January 13–15: NCAP #7 in  Schonach im Schwarzwald
 Winner #1:  Mika Vermeulen
 Winner #2:  Martin Hahn
 February 25–26: NCAP #8 in  Kranj
 Winner #1:  Mika Vermeulen
 Winner #2:  Jonas Welde
 March 3–5: NCAP #9 in  Hinterzarten
 Winners #1:  Stefan Rettenegger (m) /  Jenny Nowak (f)
 Winners #2:  Luis Lehnert (m) /  Alexandra Seifert (f)
 Teams winners:
 March 11 & 12: NCAP #10 (final) in  Chaux-Neuve
 Winners #1:  Luis Lehnert (m) /  Joséphine Pagnier (f)
 Winners #2:  Aaron Kostner (m) / Women's is cancelled

Nordic skiing
 January 30 – February 5: 2017 Nordic Junior World Ski Championships in  Park City, Utah
  won both the gold and overall medal tallies.
 February 10–19: 2017 World Para Nordic Skiing Championships in  Finsterau
  won both the gold and overall medal tallies.
 February 22 – March 5: FIS Nordic World Ski Championships 2017 in  Lahti
  won both the gold and overall medal tallies.

Ski jumping

World Championships (SJ)
 January 30 – February 5: Part of the 2017 Nordic Junior World Ski Championships in  Park City, Utah
 Individual winners:  Viktor Polasek (m) /  Manuela Malsiner (f)
 Men's team winners:  (Žiga Jelar, Tilen Bartol, Aljaž Osterc, & Bor Pavlovčič)
 Women's team winners:  (Agnes Reisch, Luisa Görlich, Pauline Heßler, & Gianina Ernst)
 Mixed team winners:  (Nika Križnar, Tilen Bartol, Ema Klinec, & Žiga Jelar)
 February 22 – March 5: Part of the FIS Nordic World Ski Championships 2017 in  Lahti
 Individual normal hill winners:  Stefan Kraft (m) /  Carina Vogt (f)
 Men's individual large hill winners:  Stefan Kraft
 Men's team large hill winners:  (Piotr Żyła, Dawid Kubacki, Maciej Kot, & Kamil Stoch)
 Mixed team normal hill winners:  (Carina Vogt, Markus Eisenbichler, Svenja Würth, & Andreas Wellinger)

2016–17 Four Hills Tournament
 December 29 & 30, 2016: FHT #1 in  Oberstdorf #1
 Winner:  Stefan Kraft
 December 31, 2016 & January 1, 2017: FHT #2 in  Garmisch-Partenkirchen
 Winner:  Daniel-André Tande
 January 3 & 4: FHT #3 in  Innsbruck
 Winner:  Daniel-André Tande
 January 5 & 6: FHT #4 (final) in  Bischofshofen
 Winner:  Kamil Stoch

2016–17 FIS Ski Jumping World Cup
 September 9–11, 2016: SJWC #1 in  Chaykovsky, Perm Krai
 Winners #1:  Robert Kranjec (m) /  Sara Takanashi (f)
 Winners #2:  Anže Semenič (m) /  Sara Takanashi (f)
 September 16–18, 2016: SJWC #2 in  Almaty
 All events cancelled here.
 September 30 – October 2, 2016: SJWC #3 in  Hinzenbach #1
 Men's Winner:  Maciej Kot (2 times)
 November 24–26, 2016: SJWC #4 in  Ruka
 Men's Winners:  Domen Prevc (#1) /  Severin Freund (#2)
 December 1–3, 2016: SJWC #5 in  Lillehammer #1
 Women's Winner:  Sara Takanashi (2 times)
 December 2–4, 2016: SJWC #6 in  Klingenthal
 Men's Winner:  Domen Prevc
 Team Winners:  (Piotr Żyła, Kamil Stoch, Dawid Kubacki, Maciej Kot)
 December 9–11, 2016: SJWC #7 in  Lillehammer #2
 Note: The men's events was supposed to be hosted in Nizhny Tagil, but was cancelled.
 Men's Winners:  Domen Prevc (#1) /  Kamil Stoch (#2)
 December 9–11, 2016: SJWC #8 in  Nizhny Tagil
 Women's Winners:  Maren Lundby (#1) /  Sara Takanashi (#2)
 December 16–18, 2016: SJWC #9 in  Engelberg
 Men's Winners:  Michael Hayböck (#1) /  Domen Prevc (#2)
 January 6–8: SJWC #10 in  Oberstdorf #2
 Women's Winner:  Sara Takanashi (2 times)
 January 13–15: SJWC #11 in  Wisła
 Men's Winner:  Kamil Stoch (2 times)
 January 13–15: SJWC #12 in  Sapporo #1
 Women's Winners:  Yuki Ito (#1) /  Maren Lundby (#2)
 January 19–21: SJWC #13 in  Zaō, Miyagi
 Women's Winner:  Yuki Ito (2 times)
 January 20–22: SJWC #14 in  Zakopane
 Men's Winner:  Kamil Stoch
 Team Winners:  (Markus Eisenbichler, Stephan Leyhe, Andreas Wellinger, Richard Freitag)
 January 27–29: SJWC #15 in  Willingen
 Men's Winner:  Andreas Wellinger
 Team Winners:  (Piotr Żyła, Dawid Kubacki, Maciej Kot, Kamil Stoch)
 January 27–29: SJWC #16 in  Râșnov
 Women's Winners:  Maren Lundby (#1) /  Sara Takanashi (#2)
 February 3–5: SJWC #17 in  Oberstdorf #3
 Men's Winner:  Stefan Kraft (2 times)
 February 3–5: SJWC #18 in  Hinzenbach #2
 Women's Winner:  Sara Takanashi (2 times)
 February 10–12: SJWC #19 in  Sapporo #2
 Men's Winners:  Maciej Kot (#1) /  Kamil Stoch (#2)
 February 11–12: SJWC #20 in  Ljubno
 Women's Winners:  Maren Lundby (#1) /  Katharina Althaus (#2)
 February 14–16: SJWC #21 in  Pyeongchang
 Men's Winners:  Stefan Kraft (#1) /  Maciej Kot (#2)
 Women's Winners:  Yuki Ito (#1) /  Sara Takanashi (#2)
 March 10–19: Raw Air 2017 (debut event)
 March 10–12: SJWC #22 in  Oslo
 Winners:  Stefan Kraft (m) /  Yuki Ito (f)
 Men's Team Winners:  (Michael Hayböck, Manuel Fettner, Markus Schiffner, & Stefan Kraft)
 March 13 & 14: SJWC #23 in  Lillehammer #3
 Event cancelled.
 March 15 & 16: SJWC #24 in  Trondheim
 Men's Winner:  Stefan Kraft
 March 17–19: SJWC #25 (RA 2017 final) in  Vikersund
 One of the men's events here was cancelled.
 Men's Winner:  Kamil Stoch
 Team Winners:  (Daniel-André Tande, Robert Johansson, Johann André Forfang, & Andreas Stjernen)
 March 23–26: SJWC #26 (final) in  Planica
 Men's Winner:  Stefan Kraft (2 times)
 Team Winners:  (Robert Johansson, Johann André Forfang, Anders Fannemel, & Andreas Stjernen)

2016 FIS Ski Jumping Grand Prix
 July 15 & 16: SJGP #1 in  Courchevel
 Winners:  Maciej Kot (m) /  Sara Takanashi (f)
 July 21–23: SJGP #2 in  Wisła
 Individual winner:  Maciej Kot
 Teams winner:  (Johann André Forfang, Tom Hilde, Joachim Hauer, Anders Fannemel)
 July 29 & 30: SJGP #3 in  Hinterzarten
 Winner:  Andreas Wellinger
 August 5 & 6: SJGP #4 in  Einsiedeln
 Winner:  Maciej Kot
 August 26–28: SJGP #5 in  Hakuba
 Winner #1:  Anders Fannemel
 Winner #2:  Taku Takeuchi
 September 9–11: SJGP #6 in  Chaykovsky
 Winners #1:  Robert Kranjec (m) /  Sara Takanashi (f)
 Winners #2:  Anže Semenič (m) /  Sara Takanashi (f)
 September 16–18: SJGP #7 in  Almaty
 Event cancelled, due to preparations for the 2017 Winter Universiade.
 September 30 & October 1: SJGP #8 in  Hinzenbach
 Winner:  Maciej Kot (m; 2 times)
 October 2: SJGP #9 (final) in  Klingenthal
 Winner:  Maciej Kot (m; 2 times)

2016–17 FIS Ski Jumping Continental Cup
Summer
 July 1 & 2, 2016: CC #1 in  Kranj
 Winner #1:  Peter Prevc
 Winner #2:  Peter Prevc
 August 18–21, 2016: CC #2 in  Kuopio
 Winner #1:  Jarkko Määttä
 Winner #2:  Jarl Magnus Riiber
 August 26 & 27, 2016: CC #3 in  Frenštát pod Radhoštěm
 Winner #1:  Lukáš Hlava
 Winner #2:  Aleksander Zniszczoł
 August 26–28, 2016: CC #4 in  Oberwiesenthal
 Winner:  Lucile Morat (2 times)
 September 10 & 11, 2016: CC #5 in  Lillehammer
 Winners #1:  Joacim Ødegård Bjøreng (m) /  Thea Sofie Kleven (f)
 Winners #2:  Markus Eisenbichler (m) / The women's event was cancelled.
 September 17 & 18, 2016: CC #6 in  Stams
 Winner #1:  Markus Eisenbichler (2 times)
 September 24 & 25, 2016: CC #7 in  Wisła
 Winner #1:  Davide Bresadola
 Winner #2:  Markus Eisenbichler
 September 30 & October 1, 2016: CC #8 in  Klingenthal
 Winner #1:  Markus Eisenbichler
 Winner #2:  Jurij Tepeš
Winter
 December 9–11, 2016: CC #9 in  Vikersundbakken 
 Winner #1:  Cene Prevc
 Winner #2:  Cene Prevc
 Winner #3:  Anže Semenič
 December 15–17, 2016 CC #10 in  Notodden
 Women's winners:  Josephine Pagnier (2 times)
 December 17 & 18, 2016: CC #11 in  Rukatunturi
 Winner #1:  Ulrich Wohlgenannt
 Winner #2:  Elias Tollinger
 December 27 & 28, 2016: CC #12 in  Engelberg
 Winner #1:  Halvor Egner Granerud
 Winner #2:  Daniel Huber
 January 7 & 8: CC #13 in  Titisee-Neustadt
 Winner #1:  Johann André Forfang
 Winner #2:  Viktor Polášek
 January 14 & 15: CC #14 in  Garmisch-Partenkirchen
 Winner #1:  Anže Lanišek
 Winner #2:  Miran Zupančič
 January 20–22: CC #15 in  Sapporo
 Winner #1:  Miran Zupančič
 Winner #2:  Clemens Aigner
 Winner #3:  Andreas Wank
 January 28 & 29: CC #16 in  Bischofshofen
 Winner #1:  Clemens Aigner
 Winner #2:  Tomáš Vančura
 February 4 & 5: CC #17 in  Erzurum
 Winner #1:  Nejc Dežman
 Winner #2:  Nejc Dežman
 February 11 & 12: CC #18 in  Brotterode
 Winner #1:  Nejc Dežman
 Winner #2:  Felix Hoffmann
 February 18 & 19, 2017: CC #19 in  Planica
 Winner #1:  Bor Pavlovčič
 Winner #2:  Tilen Bartol
 February 25 & 26: CC #20 in  Iron Mountain, Michigan
 Winner #1:  Stefan Huber
 Winner #2:  Halvor Egner Granerud
 March 4 & 5: CC #21 in  Rena
 Winners:  Clemens Aigner (2 times)
 March 11 & 12: CC #22 in  Zakopane
 Winners:  Clemens Aigner (2 times)
 March 18 & 19: CC #23 in  Chaykovsky (final)
 Winner #1:  Constantin Schmid
 Winner #2:  Clemens Aigner

2016–17 FIS Ski Jumping Alpen Cup
 August 7 & 8, 2016: OPA #1 in  Klingenthal
 Winner #1:  Virág Vörös (2 times)
 August 10 & 11, 2016: OPA #2 in  Pöhla
 Winner #1:  Virág Vörös
 Winner #2:  Lisa Eder
 August 12 & 13, 2016: OPA #3 in  Bischofsgrün
 Winner #1:  Lisa Eder
 Winner #2:  Virág Vörös
 September 10 & 11, 2016: OPA #4 in  Einsiedeln
 Winners #1:  Felix Hoffmann (m) /  Kaja Urbanija Čož (f)
 Winners #2:  Aljaž Osterc (m) /  Jerneja Brecl (f)
 September 30 & October 1, 2016: OPA #5 in  Hinterzarten
 Winner #1:  Bor Pavlovčič
 Winner #2:  Maximilian Schmalnauer
 December 16 & 17, 2016: OPA #6 in  Rastbuechl
 Winner #1:  Katra Komar
 Winner #2:  Jerneja Brecl
 December 17 & 18, 2016: OPA #6 in  Seefeld in Tirol
 Winners:  Aljaž Osterc (2 times)
 January 13 & 14: OPA #7 in  Schonach im Schwarzwald
 Winners #1:  Rok Tarman (m) /  Joséphine Pagnier (f)
 Winners #2:  Žiga Jelar (m) /  Jerneja Brecl (f)
 January 21 & 22, 2017: OPA #7 in  Žiri
 Winners:  Katra Komar (2 times)
 February 25 & 26, 2017: OPA #8 in  Kranj
 Winner #1:  Tilen Bartol
 Winner #2:  Blaž Pavlič
 March 4 & 5: OPA #9 in  Hinterzarten
 Winners #1:  David Haagen (m) /  Joséphine Pagnier (f)
 Winners #2:  Timi Zajc (m) /  Marita Kramer (f)
 Teams winners:
 March 11 & 12: OPA #10 (final) in  Chaux-Neuve
 Winners #1:  Žiga Jelar (m) /  Katra Komar (f)
 Winners #2:  Moritz Baer (m) /  Selina Freitag (f)

2016–17 FIS Ski Jumping Cup
 July 2 & 3: FC #1 in  Villach
 Winners #1:  Yuken Iwasa (m) /  Eva Logar (f)
 Winners #2:  Sebastian Colloredo (m) /  Eva Logar (f)
 July 9 & 10: FC #2 in  Szczyrk
 Winners #1:  Davide Bresadola (m) /  Kinga Rajda (f)
 Winners #2:  Davide Bresadola (m) /  Kinga Rajda (f)
 August 18–21: FC #3 in  Kuopio
 Men's winners:  Jan Ziobro (2 times)
 September 3 & 4: FC #4 in  Einsiedeln
 Winners #1:  Aljaž Osterc (m) /  Selina Freitag (f)
 Winners #2:  Aljaž Osterc (m) /  Daniela Haralambie (f)
 September 17 & 18: FC #5 in  Hinterzarten
 Winners #1:  Aljaž Osterc (m) /  Carina Vogt (f)
 Winners #2:  Yūken Iwasa /  Anna Rupprecht (f)
 September 30 & October 1: FC #6 in  Râșnov
 Winners #1:  Stefan Huber (m) /  Daniela Haralambie (f)
 Winners #2:  Paweł Wąsek (m) /  Daniela Haralambie (f)
 December 15 & 16: FC #7 in  Notodden
 Winners:  Maximilian Steiner (m) /  Luisa Görlich (f)
 Men's winner:  Maximilian Steiner
 January 7 & 8: FC #8 in  Zakopane
 Men's winners:  Ulrich Wohlgenannt (2 times)
 January 27 & 28: FC #9 in  Eau Claire, Wisconsin
 Winners #1:  Moritz Baer (m) /  Fumika Segawa (f)
 Winners #2:  Eetu Nousiainen (m) /  Rio Seto (f)
 March 3–5: FC #10 (final) in  Sapporo
 Winner #1:  Yūken Iwasa
 Winner #2:  Pius Paschke

Snowboarding

World Championships (SB)
 February 1–8: 2017 World Para Snowboard Championships in  Big White
 The  won the gold medal tally. The  won the overall medal tally.
 February 18–21: FIS Snowboarding Junior World Championships 2017 (SBX and AS events) in  Klínovec
 Snowboard Cross winners:  Kalle Koblet (m) /  Kristina Paul (f)
 Team Snowboard Cross winners: The  (Jake Vedder & Senna Leith) (m) /  (Manon Petit & Julia Pereira) (f)
 Parallel Giant Slalom winners:  Dmitry Sarsembaev (m) /  Milena Bykova (f)
 Parallel Slalom winners:  Ilia Vitugov (m) /  Jemima Juritz (f)
 March 7–19: FIS Freestyle Ski and Snowboarding World Championships 2017 in  Sierra Nevada
 Big Air winners:  Ståle Sandbech (m) /  Anna Gasser (f)
 Half-pipe winners:  Scott James (m) /  Cai Xuetong (f)
 Parallel Giant Slalom winners:  Andreas Prommegger (m) /  Ester Ledecká (f)
 Parallel Slalom winners:  Andreas Prommegger (m) /  Daniela Ulbing (f)
 Slopestyle winners:  Seppe Smits (m) /  Laurie Blouin (f)
 Snowboard Cross winners:  Pierre Vaultier (m) /  Lindsey Jacobellis (f)
 Team Snowboard Cross winners:  (Hagen Kearney & Nick Baumgartner) (m) /  (Nelly Moenne Loccoz & Chloé Trespeuch) (f)
 March 30 – April 1: FIS Snowboarding Junior World Championships 2017 (FS events only) in  Špindlerův Mlýn
 Men's winners:  Yuri Okubo (Big Air) /  Chris Corning (Slopestyle)
 Women's Big Air and Slopestyle winner:  Tess Coady

Alpine snowboarding
 December 15, 2016: ASWC #1 in  Carezza
 Parallel Giant Slalom winners:  Benjamin Karl (m) /  Ina Meschik (f)
 December 17, 2016: ASWC #2 in  Cortina d'Ampezzo
 Parallel Slalom winners:  Andrey Sobolev (m) /  Ester Ledecká (f)
 January 10 & 11: ASWC #3 in  Bad Gastein
 Parallel Slalom winners:  Christoph Mick (m) /  Daniela Ulbing (f)
 Team Parallel Slalom winners:  (Daniela Ulbing & Benjamin Karl)
 January 28: ASWC #4 in  Rogla Ski Resort
 Parallel Giant Slalom winners:  Nevin Galmarini (m) /  Ester Ledecká (f)
 February 3 & 5: ASWC #5 in  Bansko
 Parallel Giant Slalom #1 winners:  Radoslav Yankov (m) /  Patrizia Kummer (f)
 Parallel Giant Slalom #2 winners:  Sylvain Dufour (m) /  Alena Zavarzina (f)
 February 12: ASWC #6 in  Bokwang
 Parallel Giant Slalom winners:  Andreas Prommegger (m) /  Alena Zavarzina (f)
 February 25: ASWC #7 in  Moscow-Shukolovo
 Note 1: This event was supposed to be hosted in Kazan, but it was cancelled due to alleged financial reasons.
 Note 2: This event was cancelled again, but the reasons are unknown this time.
 March 5: ASWC #8 in  Kayseri
 Parallel Giant Slalom winners:  Andreas Prommegger (m) /  Ester Ledecká (f)
 March 17–19: ASWC #9 (final) in  Winterberg
 Parallel Slalom winners:  Stefan Baumeister (m) /  Sabine Schoeffmann (f)
 Team Parallel Slalom winners:  (Nadya Ochner & Aaron March)

Snowboard cross
 December 15–18, 2016: SBXWC #1 in  Montafon
 Snowboard Cross winners:  Hagen Kearney (m) /  Belle Brockhoff (f)
 Team Snowboard Cross winners:  (Regino Hernández & Lucas Eguibar) (m) /  (Nelly Moenne Loccoz & Chloé Trespeuch) (f)
 January 19–22: SBXWC #2 in  Solitude Mountain Resort
 Snowboard Cross winners:  Alessandro Hämmerle (m) /  Eva Samková (f)
 Team Snowboard Cross winners:  (Luca Matteotti & Emanuel Perathoner) (m) /  (Lindsey Jacobellis & Rosina Mancari) (f)
 February 2 & 4: SBXWC #3 in  Bansko
 Snowboard Cross winners:  Alessandro Hämmerle (m) /  Belle Brockhoff (f)
 February 10–12: SBXWC #4 in  Feldberg
 Snowboard Cross #1 winners:  Pierre Vaultier (m) /  Michela Moioli (f)
 Snowboard Cross #2 winners:  Alex Pullin (m) /  Eva Samková (f)
 February 24 & 26: SBXWC #5 in  Kazan
 Event cancelled, due to alleged financial reasons.
 March 4 & 5: SBXWC #6 in  La Molina
 Snowboard Cross winners:  Pierre Vaultier (m) /  Michela Moioli (f)
 March 24–26: SBXWC #7 (final) in  Veysonnaz
 Snowboard Cross winners:  Pierre Vaultier (m) /  Charlotte Bankes (f)
 Team Snowboard Cross winners:  (Markus Schairer & Alessandro Hämmerle) (m) /  (Raffaella Brutto & Michela Moioli) (f)

Freestyle snowboarding
 November 12, 2016: FSWC #1 in  Milan
 Big Air winners:  Marcus Kleveland (m) /  Anna Gasser (f)
 November 25 & 26, 2016: FSWC #2 in  Alpensia Resort
 Big Air winners:  Mark McMorris (m) /  Anna Gasser (f)
 December 3, 2016: FSWC #3 in  Mönchengladbach
 Big Air winners:  Roope Tonteri (m) /  Anna Gasser (f)
 December 14–17, 2016: FSWC #4 in  Copper Mountain
 Big Air winners:  Maxence Parrot (m) /  Jamie Anderson (f)
 Half-pipe winners:  Patrick Burgener (m) /  Chloe Kim (f)
 January 7: FSWC #5 in  Moscow
 Big Air winners:  Vlad Khadarin (m) /  Katie Ormerod (f)
 January 13 & 14: FSWC #6 in  Kreischberg
 Slopestyle winners:  Mons Røisland (m) /  Anna Gasser (f)
 January 16–21: FSWC #7 in  Laax
 Slopestyle winners:  Maxence Parrot (m) /  Enni Rukajärvi (f)
 Half-pipe winners:  Josey Chase (m) /  Chloe Kim (f)
 January 25 & 27: FSWC #8 in  Seiser Alm
 Slopestyle winners:  Seppe Smits (m) /  Enni Rukajärvi (f)
 February 1–5: FSWC #9 in  Mammoth Mountain Ski Area
 Slopestyle winners:  Redmond Gerard (m) /  Jamie Anderson (f)
 Half-pipe winners:  Shaun White (m) /  Kelly Clark (f)
 February 9–12: FSWC #10 in  Quebec City
 Big Air winners:  Mark McMorris (m) /  Anna Gasser (f)
 Slopestyle winners:  Sebastien Toutant (m) /  Julia Marino (f)
 February 17 & 19: FSWC #11 in  Bokwang
 Half-pipe winners:  Scott James (m) /  Kelly Clark (f)
 March 24 & 25: FSWC #12 (final) in  Špindlerův Mlýn
 Slopestyle winners:  Chris Corning (m) /  Zoi Sadowski Synnott (f)

2016–17 Europa Cup
 November 3 & 4, 2016: EC #1 in  Landgraaf
 Parallel Slalom #1 winners:  Maurizio Bormolini (m) /  Michelle Dekker (f)
 Parallel Slalom #2 winners:  Maurizio Bormolini (m) /  Carolin Langenhorst (f)
 November 9 & 10, 2016: EC #2 in  Landgraaf
 Slopestyle #1 winners:  Erik Bastiaansen (m) /  Babs Barnhoorn (f)
 Slopestyle #2 winners:  Max de Vries (m) /  Babs Barnhoorn (f) 
 November 26 & 27, 2016: EC #3 in  Kaunertal
 Big Air winners:  Davide Boggio (m) /  Elena Kostenko (f)
 Slopestyle winners:  Lyon Farrell (m) /  Katerina Vojackova (f)
 November 30 & December 1, 2016: EC #4 in  Pitztal
 Snowboardcross #1 winners:  Lucas Eguibar (m) /  Belle Brockhoff (f)
 Snowboardcross #2 winners:  Lucas Eguibar (m) /  Belle Brockhoff (f)
 December 10 & 11, 2016: EC #5 in  Hochfügen
 Parallel Giant Slalom #1 winners:  Sylvain Dufour (m) /  Elizaveta Salikhova (f)
 Parallel Giant Slalom #2 winners:  Sylvain Dufour (m) /  Ekaterina Khatomchenkova (f)
 December 15 & 16, 2016: EC #6 in  Val Thorens
 Snowboardcross #1 winners:  Adam Lambert (m) /  Gaia Tarasco (f)
 Snowboardcross #2 winners:  Adam Lambert (m) /  Sofia Belingheri (f)
 January 7 & 8: EC #7 in  Gerlitzen
 Parallel Giant Slalom #1 winners:  Jure Hafner (m) /  Weronika Biela (f)
 Parallel Giant Slalom #2 winners:  Bo-Gun Choi (m) /  Nicole Baumgartner
 January 20 & 21: EC #8 in  Pila
 Cancelled
 January 20 & 21: EC #9 in  Livigno
 Men's Parallel Giant Slalom winners:  Maurizio Bormolini (#1) /  Kim Sang-kyum (#2)
 Women's Parallel Giant Slalom winners:  Nadya Ochner (#1) /  Selina Jörg (#2)
 January 24 & 25: EC #10 in  Vars
 Slopestyle #1 winners:  Bendik Gjerdalen (m) /  Carola Niemelä (f)
 Slopestyle #2 winners:  Takeru Otsuka (m) /  Emmi Parkkisenniemi (f)
 January 28 & 29: EC #11 in  Grasgehren
 Snowboardcross #1 winners:  Adam Lambert (m) /  Julia Pereira (f)
 Snowboardcross #2 winners:  Glenn de Blois (m) /  Gaia Tarasco (f)
 January 28 & 29: EC #12 in  Font-Romeu-Odeillo-Via
 Big Air #1 winners:  Enzo Valax (m) /  Elena Kostenko (f)
 Big Air #2 winners:  Enzo Valax (m) /  Elena Kostenko (f)
 January 31 & February 1: EC #13 in  Maribor
 Cancelled
 February 3 & 4: EC #13 in  Puy-Saint-Vincent
 Men's Snowboardcross winners:  Nick Watter (#1) / #2 is cancelled
 Women's Snowboardcross winners:  Francesca Gallina (#1) / #2 is cancelled
 February 11 & 12: EC #14 in  Sarajevo
 Big Air winners:  Nicola Liviero (m) /  Maryia Masla (f)
 February 17: EC #15 in  Bischofswiesen/Goetschen
 Big Air winners:  Stef Vandeweyer (m) /  Louise Nordström (f)
 February 23–26: EC #16 in  Colere
 Men's Snowboardcross winners:  Paul Berg (#1) /  Ken Vuagnoux (#2)
 Women's Snowboardcross winners:  Sofia Belingheri (#1) /  Francesca Gallina (#2)
 February 24 & 25: EC #17 in  Davos
 Halfpipe winners:  CHO Hyeon-Min (m) /  Carla Somaini (f)
 Big Air winners:  Moritz Boll (m) /  Antonia Yañez (f)
 February 25 & 26: EC #18 in  Lenzerheide
 Men's Parallel Slalom winners:  Dario Caviezel (#1) /  Sebastian Kislinger (#2)
 Women's Parallel Slalom winners:  Sabine Schöffmann (2 times)
 February 25 & 26: EC #19 in  Erzurum
 Cancelled
 March 4 & 5: EC #20 in  Kopaonik
 Big Air #1 winners:  Nicola Liviero (m) /  Lea Jugovac (f)
 Big Air #2 winners:  Nikita Tiuterev (m) /  Elena Kostenko (f)
 March 13 & 14: EC #21 in  Pamporovo
 Women's Slopestyle winners: 
 March 16 & 17: EC #22 in  Rogla
 Cancelled
 March 16–19: EC #23 in  Laax
 Slopestyle winners:  Simon Gschaider (m) /  Elli Pikkujämsä (f)
 Halfpipe winners:  Patrick Burgener (m) /  Verena Rohrer (f)
 March 17 & 18: EC #24 in  Radstadt
 Parallel Slalom #1 winners:  Johann Stefaner (m) /  Milena Bykova (f)
 Parallel Slalom #2 winners:  Johann Stefaner (m) /  Elisa Profanter (f)
 March 17 & 18: EC #25 in  Lenk
 Snowboardcross #1 winners:  Hanno Douschan (m) /  Julia Pereira (f) 
 March 24–26: EC #26 in  Kühtai
 Note: The women's Big Air event was cancelled.
 Big Air winner:  Moritz Amsuess
 Halfpipe winners:  Toby Miller (m) /  Leilani Ettel (f)
 March 25 & 26: EC #27 in  Ratschings
 Parallel Slalom #1 winners:  Lukas Mathies (m) /  Ladina Jenny (f)
 Parallel Slalom #2 winners:  Stefan Baumeister (m) /  Jemima Juritz (f)
 March 28 & 29: EC #28 in  Rogla
 Parallel Giant Slalom winners:  Sebastian Kislinger (m) /  Milena Bykova (f)
 Parallel Slalom winners:  Benjamin Karl (m) /  Sabine Schöffmann (f)
 April 1 & 2: EC #29 in  Jasná
 Event cancelled.
 April 1 & 2: EC #30 in  Scuol
 Parallel Giant Slalom winners:  Nevin Galmarini (m) /  Ladina Jenny (f)
 Parallel Slalom winners:  Maurizio Bormolini (m) /  Karolina Sztokfisz (f)
 April 8 & 9: EC #31 in  Pec pod Sněžkou
 Event cancelled.
 April 18–22: EC #32 (final) in  Silvaplana
 Note: The half-pipe events here was cancelled.
 Big Air winners:  Jonas Boesiger (m) /  Emmi Parkkisenniemi (f)
 Slopestyle winners:  Dario Burch (m) /  Elena Koenz (f)

2016–17 Nor-Am Cup
 November 29 & 30, 2016: NAC #1 in  Snow King Mountain Resort
 Cancelled
 December 16–18, 2016: NAC #2 in  Buck Hill
 Parallel Slalom #1 winners:  Richard Evanoff (m) /  Maggie Carrigan (f)
 Parallel Slalom #2 winners:  Arnaud Gaudet (m) /  Maggie Carrigan (f)
 Parallel Slalom #3 winners:  Robert Burns (m) /  Maggie Carrigan (f)
 January 4–7: NAC #3 in  Le Relais
 Men's Parallel Slalom winners:  Mike Trapp (#1) /  Sébastien Beaulieu (#2)
 Women's Parallel Slalom winners:  Megan Farrell (2 times)
 January 14 & 15: NAC #4 in  Steamboat Springs
 Parallel Giant Slalom winners:  Mike Trapp (m) /  Megan Farrell (f)
 Men's Parallel Slalom winner:  Richard Evanoff (m) /  Megan Farrell (f)
 February 1–3: NAC #5 in  Mont-Tremblant, Quebec
 Snowboardcross #1 winners:  Senna Leith (m) /  Katie Wilson (f)
 Snowboardcross #2 winners:  Senna Leith (m) /  Audrey McManiman (f)
 February 8–10: NAC #6 in  Craigleith Ski Club
 Snowboardcross #1 winners:  Senna Leith (m) /  Audrey McManiman (f)
 Snowboardcross #2 winners:  Senna Leith (m) /  Audrey McManiman (f)
 February 9 & 10: NAC #7 in  Holiday Valley
 Men's Parallel Giant Slalom winners:  Justin Reiter (2 times)
 Women's Parallel Giant Slalom winners:  Rebecca Letourneau-Duynstee (#1) /  Maggie Carrigan (#2)
 February 10–12: NAC #8 in  Canada Olympic Park
 Halfpipe winners:  Trevor Niblett (m) /  Calynn Irwin (f)
 Slopestyle winners:  Joshua Reeves (m) /  Marguerite Sweeney (f)
 February 13–16: NAC #9 in  Toronto Ski Club/Toronto
 Men's Parallel Giant Slalom winners:  Robert Burns (#1) /  Michael Trapp (#2)
 Women's Parallel Giant Slalom winners:  Marianne Laurin-Lalonde (#1) /  Maggie Carrigan (#2)
 February 13–17: NAC #10 in  Sunday River
 Snowboardcross #1 winners:  Michael Perle (m) /  Colleen Healey (f)
 Snowboardcross #2 winners:  Cole Johnson (m) /  Katie Anderson (f)
 February 15 & 16: NAC #11 in  Sun Peaks Resort
 Men's Slopestyle winners:  Carter Jarvis (m) /  Baily Mcdonald (f)
 Women's Slopestyle winners:  Kix Kamp (m) /  Marguerite Sweeney (f)
 February 20–25: NAC #12 in  Ski Cooper
 Snowboardcross #1 winners:  Robert Minghini (m) /  Katie Anderson (f)
 Snowboardcross #2 winners:  Danny Bourgeois (m) /  Anna Miller (f)
 March 5–12: #13 in  Mount St. Louis Moonstone
 Slopestyle winners:  Carter Jarvis (m) /  Baily Mcdonald (f)
 March 8–10: #14 in  Big White Ski Resort
 Snowboardcross #1 winners:  Robert Minghini (m) /  Colleen Healey (f)
 Snowboardcross #2 winners:  Adam Dickson (m) /  Katie Anderson (f)
 March 31 – April 4: #15 in  Copper Mountain
 Snowboardcross winners:  Jake Vedder (m) /  Colleen Healey (f)
 Parallel Giant Slalom winners:  Darren Gardner (m) /  Ina Meschik (f)
 Parallel Slalom winners:  Aaron Muss (m) /  Ina Meschik (f)
 April 4–9: #16 (final) in  Mont-Tremblant
 Snowboardcross winners:  Christopher Robanske (m) /  Audrey McManiman (f)
 Parallel Slalom winners:  Robert Burns (m) /  SHIN Da-hae (f)

2016 FIS Snowboard Australia/New Zealand Cup
 August 4–7: SBANC #1 in  Mount Hotham #1
 Men's Snowboardcross winner:  Alex Pullin
 Women's Snowboardcross winner:  Belle Brockhoff
 August 15–18: SBANC #2 in  Thredbo
 Cancelled due to insufficient snow at the snow control. 
 August 30 – September 2: SBANC #3 in  Mount Hotham #2
 Snowboardcross #1 winners:  Josh Miller (m) /  Belle Brockhoff (f)
 Snowboardcross #2 winners:  Alex Pullin (m) /  Belle Brockhoff (f)
 September 13–16: SBANC #4 (final) in  Cardrona
 Slopestyle winners:  Sebastien Toutant (m) /  Zoi Sadowski-Synnott (f)
 Halfpipe winners:  Ando Naito (m) /  Kurumi Imai (f)

2016 FIS Snowboard South American Cup
 August 17–21: SBSAC #1 in  Cerro Catedral #1
 Snowboardcross winners 1:  Steven Williams (m) /  Colleen Healey (f)
 Snowboardcross winners 2:  Simon White (m) /  Colleen Healey (f)
 August 26 & 27: SBSAC #2 in  El Colorado
 Big Air #1 winners:  Federico Chiaradio (m) /  Antonia Yáñez (f)
 Big Air #2 winners:  Iñaki Odriozola (m) /  Elena Kostenko (f)
 September 9–11: SBSAC #3 in  Cerro Catedral #2
 Slopestyle #1 winners:  Grant Giller (m) /  Elena Kostenko (f)
 Slopestyle #2 winners:  Martín Jaureguialzo (m) /  Elena Kostenko (f)
 September 22–26: SBSAC #4 (final) in  Corralco
 Snowboardcross winners 1:  Steven Williams (m) /  Isabel Clark Ribeiro
 Snowboardcross winners 2:  Steven Williams (m) /  Isabel Clark Ribeiro

Telemark skiing

Telemark skiing world events
 March 1–4: 2017 FIS Telemark Junior World Championships in  Rjukan
 Classic winners:  Guillaume Issautier (m) /  Kathrin Reischmann (f)
 Sprint winners:  Kristian Lauvik Gjelstad (m) /  Chloe Blyth (f)
 Parallel Sprint winners:  Matti Lopez (m) /  Kathrin Reischmann (f)
 Team Parallel Sprint winners:

2016–17 FIS Telemark World Cup
 November 24–27, 2016: TSWC #1 in  Tux
 Sprint #1 winners:  Philippe Lau (m) /  Amélie Reymond (f)
 Sprint #2 winners:  Tobias Mueller (m) /  Amélie Reymond (f)
 Parallel Sprint winners:  Jonas Schmid (m) /  Amélie Reymond (f)
 January 19 & 20: TSWC #2 in  La Thuile
 Sprint winners:  Philippe Lau (m) /  Amélie Reymond (f)
 Classic winners:  Bastien Dayer (m) /  Amélie Reymond (f)
 January 21 & 22: TSWC #3 in  Méribel
 Sprint winners:  Philippe Lau (m) /  Amélie Reymond (f)
 Parallel Sprint winners:  Tobias Mueller (m) /  Amélie Reymond (f)
 January 28–30: TSWC #4 in  Krvavec Ski Resort
 Sprint winners:  Nicolas Michel (m)  Amélie Reymond (f)
 Parallel Sprint winners:  Stefan Matter (m) /  Amélie Reymond (f)
 Mixed Team Parallel Sprint winners: 
 February 4 & 5: TSWC #5 in  Bad Hindelang/Oberjoch
 Parallel Sprint #1 winners:  Tobias Mueller (m) /  Amélie Reymond (f)
 Parallel Sprint #2 winners:  Jonas Schmid (m) /  Amélie Reymond (f)
 February 24–26: TSWC #6 in  Hurdal
 Classic winners:  Trym Nygaard Løken (m) /  Amélie Reymond (f)
 Parallel Sprint winners:  Trym Nygaard Løken (m) /  Amélie Reymond (f)
 Sprint winners:  Tobias Mueller (m) /  Amélie Reymond (f)
 March 1–3: TSWC #7 in  Rjukan (part of FIS Telemark Junior World Championships)
 Classic winners:  Tobias Mueller (m) /  Amélie Reymond (f)
 Sprint winners:  Tobias Mueller (m) /  Amélie Reymond (f)
 Parallel Sprint winners:  Tobias Mueller (m) /  Amélie Reymond (f)
 March 9–11: TSWC #8 in  Thyon
 Classic winners:  Bastien Dayer (m) /  Amélie Reymond (f)
 Parallel Sprint winners:  Trym Nygaard Løken (m) /  Amélie Reymond (f)
 Sprint winners:  Tobias Mueller (m) /  Amélie Reymond (f)
 March 15–19: TSWC #9 (final) in  La Plagne/Montchavin-les-Coches (part of 2017 FIS World Telemark Skiing Championships)
 Team Parallel Sprint winners: 
 Parallel Sprint winners:  Philippe Lau (m) /  Amélie Reymond (f)
 Classic winners:  Stefan Matter (m) /  Amélie Reymond (f)
 Sprint winners:  Tobias Mueller (m) /  Amélie Reymond (f)

References

External links
 International Ski Federation official website
 IPC Alpine Skiing official website
 International Biathlon Union official website
 IPC Biathlon and Cross Country Skiing official website
 IPC Snowboard official website

Skiing by year
Skiing
Skiing
Far east